

90001–90100 

|-bgcolor=#fefefe
| 90001 ||  || — || October 3, 2002 || Socorro || LINEAR || — || align=right | 1.5 km || 
|-id=002 bgcolor=#fefefe
| 90002 ||  || — || October 3, 2002 || Socorro || LINEAR || NYS || align=right | 1.2 km || 
|-id=003 bgcolor=#fefefe
| 90003 ||  || — || October 4, 2002 || Socorro || LINEAR || V || align=right | 1.6 km || 
|-id=004 bgcolor=#E9E9E9
| 90004 ||  || — || October 5, 2002 || Palomar || NEAT || — || align=right | 3.7 km || 
|-id=005 bgcolor=#fefefe
| 90005 ||  || — || October 5, 2002 || Palomar || NEAT || H || align=right data-sort-value="0.84" | 840 m || 
|-id=006 bgcolor=#E9E9E9
| 90006 ||  || — || October 5, 2002 || Socorro || LINEAR || — || align=right | 3.4 km || 
|-id=007 bgcolor=#E9E9E9
| 90007 ||  || — || October 13, 2002 || Palomar || NEAT || PAL || align=right | 3.9 km || 
|-id=008 bgcolor=#d6d6d6
| 90008 ||  || — || October 4, 2002 || Socorro || LINEAR || — || align=right | 7.8 km || 
|-id=009 bgcolor=#E9E9E9
| 90009 ||  || — || October 4, 2002 || Socorro || LINEAR || — || align=right | 2.2 km || 
|-id=010 bgcolor=#d6d6d6
| 90010 ||  || — || October 4, 2002 || Socorro || LINEAR || — || align=right | 6.0 km || 
|-id=011 bgcolor=#E9E9E9
| 90011 ||  || — || October 4, 2002 || Socorro || LINEAR || PAD || align=right | 6.0 km || 
|-id=012 bgcolor=#fefefe
| 90012 ||  || — || October 7, 2002 || Socorro || LINEAR || NYS || align=right | 1.3 km || 
|-id=013 bgcolor=#E9E9E9
| 90013 ||  || — || October 9, 2002 || Socorro || LINEAR || — || align=right | 3.3 km || 
|-id=014 bgcolor=#E9E9E9
| 90014 ||  || — || October 9, 2002 || Socorro || LINEAR || — || align=right | 1.4 km || 
|-id=015 bgcolor=#fefefe
| 90015 ||  || — || October 10, 2002 || Socorro || LINEAR || V || align=right | 1.6 km || 
|-id=016 bgcolor=#fefefe
| 90016 ||  || — || October 10, 2002 || Socorro || LINEAR || — || align=right | 1.8 km || 
|-id=017 bgcolor=#fefefe
| 90017 ||  || — || October 10, 2002 || Socorro || LINEAR || — || align=right | 1.5 km || 
|-id=018 bgcolor=#fefefe
| 90018 ||  || — || October 9, 2002 || Socorro || LINEAR || — || align=right | 1.3 km || 
|-id=019 bgcolor=#E9E9E9
| 90019 ||  || — || October 10, 2002 || Socorro || LINEAR || — || align=right | 3.5 km || 
|-id=020 bgcolor=#fefefe
| 90020 ||  || — || October 10, 2002 || Socorro || LINEAR || — || align=right | 1.7 km || 
|-id=021 bgcolor=#fefefe
| 90021 ||  || — || October 10, 2002 || Socorro || LINEAR || — || align=right | 2.0 km || 
|-id=022 bgcolor=#fefefe
| 90022 Apache Point ||  ||  || October 10, 2002 || Apache Point || SDSS || — || align=right | 2.0 km || 
|-id=023 bgcolor=#E9E9E9
| 90023 ||  || — || October 28, 2002 || Socorro || LINEAR || HNS || align=right | 3.4 km || 
|-id=024 bgcolor=#d6d6d6
| 90024 ||  || — || October 28, 2002 || Palomar || NEAT || — || align=right | 3.5 km || 
|-id=025 bgcolor=#fefefe
| 90025 ||  || — || October 28, 2002 || Palomar || NEAT || — || align=right | 2.0 km || 
|-id=026 bgcolor=#E9E9E9
| 90026 ||  || — || October 28, 2002 || Palomar || NEAT || — || align=right | 3.4 km || 
|-id=027 bgcolor=#fefefe
| 90027 ||  || — || October 30, 2002 || Palomar || NEAT || NYS || align=right | 4.2 km || 
|-id=028 bgcolor=#fefefe
| 90028 ||  || — || October 28, 2002 || Haleakala || NEAT || FLO || align=right | 1.1 km || 
|-id=029 bgcolor=#d6d6d6
| 90029 ||  || — || October 30, 2002 || Haleakala || NEAT || THM || align=right | 4.5 km || 
|-id=030 bgcolor=#d6d6d6
| 90030 ||  || — || October 30, 2002 || Haleakala || NEAT || — || align=right | 6.7 km || 
|-id=031 bgcolor=#fefefe
| 90031 ||  || — || October 30, 2002 || Haleakala || NEAT || — || align=right | 1.9 km || 
|-id=032 bgcolor=#E9E9E9
| 90032 ||  || — || October 30, 2002 || Palomar || NEAT || — || align=right | 4.6 km || 
|-id=033 bgcolor=#fefefe
| 90033 ||  || — || October 30, 2002 || Haleakala || NEAT || — || align=right | 3.3 km || 
|-id=034 bgcolor=#E9E9E9
| 90034 ||  || — || October 30, 2002 || Haleakala || NEAT || EUN || align=right | 2.2 km || 
|-id=035 bgcolor=#E9E9E9
| 90035 ||  || — || October 31, 2002 || Kvistaberg || UDAS || EUN || align=right | 2.6 km || 
|-id=036 bgcolor=#fefefe
| 90036 ||  || — || October 31, 2002 || Palomar || NEAT || FLO || align=right | 1.3 km || 
|-id=037 bgcolor=#fefefe
| 90037 ||  || — || October 31, 2002 || Palomar || NEAT || MAS || align=right | 1.7 km || 
|-id=038 bgcolor=#fefefe
| 90038 ||  || — || October 31, 2002 || Socorro || LINEAR || — || align=right | 2.3 km || 
|-id=039 bgcolor=#fefefe
| 90039 ||  || — || October 31, 2002 || Socorro || LINEAR || — || align=right | 2.1 km || 
|-id=040 bgcolor=#E9E9E9
| 90040 ||  || — || October 31, 2002 || Socorro || LINEAR || RAF || align=right | 3.4 km || 
|-id=041 bgcolor=#fefefe
| 90041 || 2002 VU || — || November 1, 2002 || Haleakala || NEAT || H || align=right | 1.3 km || 
|-id=042 bgcolor=#d6d6d6
| 90042 ||  || — || November 1, 2002 || Palomar || NEAT || — || align=right | 7.7 km || 
|-id=043 bgcolor=#E9E9E9
| 90043 ||  || — || November 2, 2002 || Kitt Peak || Spacewatch || — || align=right | 1.8 km || 
|-id=044 bgcolor=#fefefe
| 90044 ||  || — || November 2, 2002 || Haleakala || NEAT || — || align=right | 1.2 km || 
|-id=045 bgcolor=#E9E9E9
| 90045 ||  || — || November 4, 2002 || Palomar || NEAT || — || align=right | 6.7 km || 
|-id=046 bgcolor=#fefefe
| 90046 ||  || — || November 2, 2002 || Palomar || NEAT || — || align=right | 1.6 km || 
|-id=047 bgcolor=#fefefe
| 90047 ||  || — || November 5, 2002 || Socorro || LINEAR || — || align=right | 1.9 km || 
|-id=048 bgcolor=#E9E9E9
| 90048 ||  || — || November 5, 2002 || Socorro || LINEAR || — || align=right | 4.8 km || 
|-id=049 bgcolor=#fefefe
| 90049 ||  || — || November 2, 2002 || Haleakala || NEAT || NYS || align=right | 1.4 km || 
|-id=050 bgcolor=#E9E9E9
| 90050 ||  || — || November 5, 2002 || Socorro || LINEAR || — || align=right | 3.0 km || 
|-id=051 bgcolor=#fefefe
| 90051 ||  || — || November 5, 2002 || Socorro || LINEAR || — || align=right | 1.7 km || 
|-id=052 bgcolor=#E9E9E9
| 90052 ||  || — || November 5, 2002 || Socorro || LINEAR || PAD || align=right | 4.1 km || 
|-id=053 bgcolor=#d6d6d6
| 90053 ||  || — || November 5, 2002 || Anderson Mesa || LONEOS || LIX || align=right | 5.5 km || 
|-id=054 bgcolor=#d6d6d6
| 90054 ||  || — || November 5, 2002 || Socorro || LINEAR || — || align=right | 5.5 km || 
|-id=055 bgcolor=#E9E9E9
| 90055 ||  || — || November 2, 2002 || Haleakala || NEAT || — || align=right | 5.0 km || 
|-id=056 bgcolor=#E9E9E9
| 90056 ||  || — || November 5, 2002 || Socorro || LINEAR || — || align=right | 4.8 km || 
|-id=057 bgcolor=#E9E9E9
| 90057 ||  || — || November 5, 2002 || Socorro || LINEAR || — || align=right | 2.7 km || 
|-id=058 bgcolor=#fefefe
| 90058 ||  || — || November 6, 2002 || Socorro || LINEAR || FLO || align=right | 1.4 km || 
|-id=059 bgcolor=#fefefe
| 90059 ||  || — || November 6, 2002 || Socorro || LINEAR || — || align=right | 1.7 km || 
|-id=060 bgcolor=#fefefe
| 90060 ||  || — || November 5, 2002 || Anderson Mesa || LONEOS || FLO || align=right | 1.5 km || 
|-id=061 bgcolor=#E9E9E9
| 90061 ||  || — || November 6, 2002 || Anderson Mesa || LONEOS || — || align=right | 2.1 km || 
|-id=062 bgcolor=#d6d6d6
| 90062 ||  || — || November 7, 2002 || Anderson Mesa || LONEOS || — || align=right | 6.5 km || 
|-id=063 bgcolor=#d6d6d6
| 90063 ||  || — || November 7, 2002 || Socorro || LINEAR || — || align=right | 6.8 km || 
|-id=064 bgcolor=#E9E9E9
| 90064 ||  || — || November 7, 2002 || Anderson Mesa || LONEOS || — || align=right | 5.5 km || 
|-id=065 bgcolor=#E9E9E9
| 90065 ||  || — || November 7, 2002 || Socorro || LINEAR || HOF || align=right | 5.2 km || 
|-id=066 bgcolor=#fefefe
| 90066 ||  || — || November 7, 2002 || Socorro || LINEAR || — || align=right | 1.8 km || 
|-id=067 bgcolor=#d6d6d6
| 90067 ||  || — || November 7, 2002 || Socorro || LINEAR || EOS || align=right | 3.9 km || 
|-id=068 bgcolor=#fefefe
| 90068 ||  || — || November 7, 2002 || Socorro || LINEAR || V || align=right | 1.7 km || 
|-id=069 bgcolor=#fefefe
| 90069 ||  || — || November 7, 2002 || Socorro || LINEAR || — || align=right | 1.8 km || 
|-id=070 bgcolor=#E9E9E9
| 90070 ||  || — || November 7, 2002 || Socorro || LINEAR || — || align=right | 2.5 km || 
|-id=071 bgcolor=#fefefe
| 90071 ||  || — || November 7, 2002 || Socorro || LINEAR || — || align=right | 1.9 km || 
|-id=072 bgcolor=#fefefe
| 90072 ||  || — || November 7, 2002 || Socorro || LINEAR || — || align=right | 2.2 km || 
|-id=073 bgcolor=#fefefe
| 90073 ||  || — || November 7, 2002 || Socorro || LINEAR || — || align=right | 1.5 km || 
|-id=074 bgcolor=#E9E9E9
| 90074 ||  || — || November 7, 2002 || Socorro || LINEAR || — || align=right | 3.6 km || 
|-id=075 bgcolor=#FFC2E0
| 90075 ||  || — || November 13, 2002 || Palomar || NEAT || APO +1kmPHA || align=right | 2.2 km || 
|-id=076 bgcolor=#fefefe
| 90076 ||  || — || November 11, 2002 || Anderson Mesa || LONEOS || — || align=right | 4.0 km || 
|-id=077 bgcolor=#E9E9E9
| 90077 ||  || — || November 11, 2002 || Socorro || LINEAR || — || align=right | 4.6 km || 
|-id=078 bgcolor=#fefefe
| 90078 ||  || — || November 12, 2002 || Socorro || LINEAR || — || align=right | 1.6 km || 
|-id=079 bgcolor=#E9E9E9
| 90079 ||  || — || November 12, 2002 || Socorro || LINEAR || — || align=right | 1.8 km || 
|-id=080 bgcolor=#d6d6d6
| 90080 ||  || — || November 12, 2002 || Socorro || LINEAR || EOS || align=right | 3.3 km || 
|-id=081 bgcolor=#fefefe
| 90081 ||  || — || November 12, 2002 || Socorro || LINEAR || V || align=right | 1.5 km || 
|-id=082 bgcolor=#fefefe
| 90082 ||  || — || November 13, 2002 || Palomar || NEAT || FLO || align=right | 1.6 km || 
|-id=083 bgcolor=#fefefe
| 90083 ||  || — || November 11, 2002 || Anderson Mesa || LONEOS || — || align=right | 2.2 km || 
|-id=084 bgcolor=#fefefe
| 90084 ||  || — || November 11, 2002 || Socorro || LINEAR || — || align=right | 3.4 km || 
|-id=085 bgcolor=#fefefe
| 90085 ||  || — || November 14, 2002 || Palomar || NEAT || PHO || align=right | 2.2 km || 
|-id=086 bgcolor=#fefefe
| 90086 ||  || — || November 7, 2002 || Socorro || LINEAR || FLO || align=right | 1.2 km || 
|-id=087 bgcolor=#d6d6d6
| 90087 ||  || — || November 23, 2002 || Palomar || NEAT || — || align=right | 3.6 km || 
|-id=088 bgcolor=#fefefe
| 90088 ||  || — || November 24, 2002 || Palomar || NEAT || — || align=right | 1.7 km || 
|-id=089 bgcolor=#E9E9E9
| 90089 ||  || — || November 27, 2002 || Anderson Mesa || LONEOS || — || align=right | 3.4 km || 
|-id=090 bgcolor=#E9E9E9
| 90090 ||  || — || November 28, 2002 || Anderson Mesa || LONEOS || — || align=right | 2.6 km || 
|-id=091 bgcolor=#E9E9E9
| 90091 ||  || — || December 1, 2002 || Socorro || LINEAR || — || align=right | 6.4 km || 
|-id=092 bgcolor=#d6d6d6
| 90092 ||  || — || December 1, 2002 || Haleakala || NEAT || — || align=right | 8.3 km || 
|-id=093 bgcolor=#fefefe
| 90093 ||  || — || December 1, 2002 || Socorro || LINEAR || — || align=right | 1.8 km || 
|-id=094 bgcolor=#fefefe
| 90094 ||  || — || December 1, 2002 || Socorro || LINEAR || V || align=right | 1.5 km || 
|-id=095 bgcolor=#d6d6d6
| 90095 ||  || — || December 2, 2002 || Socorro || LINEAR || — || align=right | 5.3 km || 
|-id=096 bgcolor=#E9E9E9
| 90096 ||  || — || December 2, 2002 || Socorro || LINEAR || — || align=right | 2.1 km || 
|-id=097 bgcolor=#d6d6d6
| 90097 ||  || — || December 2, 2002 || Socorro || LINEAR || — || align=right | 4.9 km || 
|-id=098 bgcolor=#E9E9E9
| 90098 ||  || — || December 2, 2002 || Socorro || LINEAR || — || align=right | 4.8 km || 
|-id=099 bgcolor=#E9E9E9
| 90099 ||  || — || December 2, 2002 || Haleakala || NEAT || — || align=right | 2.7 km || 
|-id=100 bgcolor=#fefefe
| 90100 ||  || — || December 3, 2002 || Palomar || NEAT || — || align=right | 2.1 km || 
|}

90101–90200 

|-bgcolor=#fefefe
| 90101 ||  || — || December 2, 2002 || Socorro || LINEAR || — || align=right | 1.6 km || 
|-id=102 bgcolor=#fefefe
| 90102 ||  || — || December 2, 2002 || Socorro || LINEAR || — || align=right | 3.2 km || 
|-id=103 bgcolor=#E9E9E9
| 90103 ||  || — || December 5, 2002 || Socorro || LINEAR || PAD || align=right | 4.4 km || 
|-id=104 bgcolor=#E9E9E9
| 90104 ||  || — || December 5, 2002 || Kitt Peak || Spacewatch || EUN || align=right | 3.1 km || 
|-id=105 bgcolor=#fefefe
| 90105 ||  || — || December 6, 2002 || Palomar || NEAT || V || align=right | 1.4 km || 
|-id=106 bgcolor=#fefefe
| 90106 ||  || — || December 5, 2002 || Socorro || LINEAR || — || align=right | 2.2 km || 
|-id=107 bgcolor=#E9E9E9
| 90107 ||  || — || December 5, 2002 || Socorro || LINEAR || — || align=right | 2.2 km || 
|-id=108 bgcolor=#E9E9E9
| 90108 ||  || — || December 6, 2002 || Palomar || NEAT || MAR || align=right | 3.1 km || 
|-id=109 bgcolor=#fefefe
| 90109 ||  || — || December 9, 2002 || Desert Eagle || W. K. Y. Yeung || — || align=right | 1.8 km || 
|-id=110 bgcolor=#fefefe
| 90110 ||  || — || December 6, 2002 || Socorro || LINEAR || — || align=right | 2.0 km || 
|-id=111 bgcolor=#E9E9E9
| 90111 ||  || — || December 6, 2002 || Socorro || LINEAR || ADE || align=right | 5.8 km || 
|-id=112 bgcolor=#d6d6d6
| 90112 ||  || — || December 7, 2002 || Kitt Peak || Spacewatch || — || align=right | 6.0 km || 
|-id=113 bgcolor=#E9E9E9
| 90113 ||  || — || December 10, 2002 || Socorro || LINEAR || — || align=right | 1.8 km || 
|-id=114 bgcolor=#E9E9E9
| 90114 ||  || — || December 10, 2002 || Socorro || LINEAR || — || align=right | 2.2 km || 
|-id=115 bgcolor=#fefefe
| 90115 ||  || — || December 10, 2002 || Palomar || NEAT || — || align=right | 1.6 km || 
|-id=116 bgcolor=#d6d6d6
| 90116 ||  || — || December 10, 2002 || Socorro || LINEAR || EOS || align=right | 5.1 km || 
|-id=117 bgcolor=#E9E9E9
| 90117 ||  || — || December 10, 2002 || Socorro || LINEAR || — || align=right | 2.0 km || 
|-id=118 bgcolor=#fefefe
| 90118 ||  || — || December 10, 2002 || Socorro || LINEAR || — || align=right | 3.9 km || 
|-id=119 bgcolor=#E9E9E9
| 90119 ||  || — || December 12, 2002 || Socorro || LINEAR || HNS || align=right | 2.3 km || 
|-id=120 bgcolor=#E9E9E9
| 90120 ||  || — || December 10, 2002 || Socorro || LINEAR || — || align=right | 3.3 km || 
|-id=121 bgcolor=#fefefe
| 90121 ||  || — || December 11, 2002 || Socorro || LINEAR || — || align=right | 4.8 km || 
|-id=122 bgcolor=#fefefe
| 90122 ||  || — || December 11, 2002 || Socorro || LINEAR || — || align=right | 1.8 km || 
|-id=123 bgcolor=#fefefe
| 90123 ||  || — || December 11, 2002 || Socorro || LINEAR || NYS || align=right | 1.2 km || 
|-id=124 bgcolor=#E9E9E9
| 90124 ||  || — || December 11, 2002 || Socorro || LINEAR || — || align=right | 2.7 km || 
|-id=125 bgcolor=#E9E9E9
| 90125 Chrissquire ||  ||  || December 11, 2002 || Socorro || LINEAR || — || align=right | 2.2 km || 
|-id=126 bgcolor=#E9E9E9
| 90126 ||  || — || December 11, 2002 || Socorro || LINEAR || — || align=right | 5.7 km || 
|-id=127 bgcolor=#fefefe
| 90127 ||  || — || December 11, 2002 || Socorro || LINEAR || — || align=right | 2.1 km || 
|-id=128 bgcolor=#d6d6d6
| 90128 ||  || — || December 11, 2002 || Socorro || LINEAR || — || align=right | 9.1 km || 
|-id=129 bgcolor=#E9E9E9
| 90129 ||  || — || December 11, 2002 || Socorro || LINEAR || — || align=right | 2.9 km || 
|-id=130 bgcolor=#E9E9E9
| 90130 ||  || — || December 11, 2002 || Socorro || LINEAR || — || align=right | 3.5 km || 
|-id=131 bgcolor=#fefefe
| 90131 ||  || — || December 11, 2002 || Socorro || LINEAR || — || align=right | 1.9 km || 
|-id=132 bgcolor=#fefefe
| 90132 ||  || — || December 11, 2002 || Socorro || LINEAR || — || align=right | 1.7 km || 
|-id=133 bgcolor=#E9E9E9
| 90133 ||  || — || December 11, 2002 || Socorro || LINEAR || MRX || align=right | 2.2 km || 
|-id=134 bgcolor=#fefefe
| 90134 ||  || — || December 5, 2002 || Socorro || LINEAR || NYS || align=right | 3.2 km || 
|-id=135 bgcolor=#E9E9E9
| 90135 ||  || — || December 5, 2002 || Socorro || LINEAR || — || align=right | 2.9 km || 
|-id=136 bgcolor=#d6d6d6
| 90136 ||  || — || December 5, 2002 || Socorro || LINEAR || — || align=right | 6.2 km || 
|-id=137 bgcolor=#d6d6d6
| 90137 ||  || — || December 6, 2002 || Socorro || LINEAR || LIX || align=right | 7.2 km || 
|-id=138 bgcolor=#fefefe
| 90138 Diehl || 2002 YD ||  || December 25, 2002 || Desert Moon || B. L. Stevens || — || align=right | 1.4 km || 
|-id=139 bgcolor=#E9E9E9
| 90139 ||  || — || December 27, 2002 || Anderson Mesa || LONEOS || — || align=right | 5.0 km || 
|-id=140 bgcolor=#fefefe
| 90140 Gómezdonet ||  ||  || December 28, 2002 || Pla D'Arguines || R. Ferrando || V || align=right | 1.1 km || 
|-id=141 bgcolor=#d6d6d6
| 90141 ||  || — || December 28, 2002 || Anderson Mesa || LONEOS || TIR || align=right | 3.5 km || 
|-id=142 bgcolor=#E9E9E9
| 90142 ||  || — || December 27, 2002 || Anderson Mesa || LONEOS || — || align=right | 4.2 km || 
|-id=143 bgcolor=#E9E9E9
| 90143 ||  || — || December 28, 2002 || Anderson Mesa || LONEOS || — || align=right | 5.5 km || 
|-id=144 bgcolor=#E9E9E9
| 90144 ||  || — || December 28, 2002 || Socorro || LINEAR || — || align=right | 2.4 km || 
|-id=145 bgcolor=#fefefe
| 90145 ||  || — || December 31, 2002 || Socorro || LINEAR || V || align=right | 2.0 km || 
|-id=146 bgcolor=#E9E9E9
| 90146 ||  || — || December 31, 2002 || Socorro || LINEAR || RAF || align=right | 2.5 km || 
|-id=147 bgcolor=#FFC2E0
| 90147 ||  || — || December 31, 2002 || Socorro || LINEAR || APO || align=right data-sort-value="0.76" | 760 m || 
|-id=148 bgcolor=#E9E9E9
| 90148 ||  || — || December 31, 2002 || Socorro || LINEAR || GEF || align=right | 3.0 km || 
|-id=149 bgcolor=#fefefe
| 90149 ||  || — || December 31, 2002 || Socorro || LINEAR || FLO || align=right | 1.5 km || 
|-id=150 bgcolor=#E9E9E9
| 90150 ||  || — || December 31, 2002 || Socorro || LINEAR || — || align=right | 3.7 km || 
|-id=151 bgcolor=#d6d6d6
| 90151 ||  || — || December 31, 2002 || Socorro || LINEAR || THM || align=right | 4.6 km || 
|-id=152 bgcolor=#fefefe
| 90152 ||  || — || December 31, 2002 || Socorro || LINEAR || — || align=right | 2.2 km || 
|-id=153 bgcolor=#d6d6d6
| 90153 ||  || — || December 31, 2002 || Socorro || LINEAR || EOS || align=right | 4.1 km || 
|-id=154 bgcolor=#fefefe
| 90154 ||  || — || December 31, 2002 || Socorro || LINEAR || V || align=right | 1.5 km || 
|-id=155 bgcolor=#d6d6d6
| 90155 ||  || — || December 31, 2002 || Socorro || LINEAR || — || align=right | 4.3 km || 
|-id=156 bgcolor=#d6d6d6
| 90156 ||  || — || December 31, 2002 || Socorro || LINEAR || LIX || align=right | 7.5 km || 
|-id=157 bgcolor=#fefefe
| 90157 ||  || — || December 31, 2002 || Socorro || LINEAR || — || align=right | 1.6 km || 
|-id=158 bgcolor=#fefefe
| 90158 ||  || — || December 31, 2002 || Socorro || LINEAR || — || align=right | 1.9 km || 
|-id=159 bgcolor=#E9E9E9
| 90159 ||  || — || December 31, 2002 || Socorro || LINEAR || — || align=right | 5.6 km || 
|-id=160 bgcolor=#E9E9E9
| 90160 ||  || — || December 29, 2002 || Socorro || LINEAR || — || align=right | 2.1 km || 
|-id=161 bgcolor=#fefefe
| 90161 ||  || — || December 31, 2002 || Socorro || LINEAR || NYS || align=right | 1.1 km || 
|-id=162 bgcolor=#fefefe
| 90162 ||  || — || January 1, 2003 || Socorro || LINEAR || H || align=right | 1.1 km || 
|-id=163 bgcolor=#d6d6d6
| 90163 ||  || — || January 1, 2003 || Socorro || LINEAR || — || align=right | 6.7 km || 
|-id=164 bgcolor=#fefefe
| 90164 ||  || — || January 1, 2003 || Socorro || LINEAR || H || align=right | 1.3 km || 
|-id=165 bgcolor=#fefefe
| 90165 ||  || — || January 1, 2003 || Socorro || LINEAR || NYS || align=right | 1.6 km || 
|-id=166 bgcolor=#E9E9E9
| 90166 ||  || — || January 1, 2003 || Socorro || LINEAR || — || align=right | 5.9 km || 
|-id=167 bgcolor=#fefefe
| 90167 ||  || — || January 3, 2003 || Nashville || R. Clingan || MAS || align=right | 1.7 km || 
|-id=168 bgcolor=#E9E9E9
| 90168 ||  || — || January 1, 2003 || Socorro || LINEAR || EUN || align=right | 2.5 km || 
|-id=169 bgcolor=#E9E9E9
| 90169 ||  || — || January 1, 2003 || Socorro || LINEAR || — || align=right | 2.3 km || 
|-id=170 bgcolor=#fefefe
| 90170 ||  || — || January 1, 2003 || Socorro || LINEAR || — || align=right | 1.7 km || 
|-id=171 bgcolor=#fefefe
| 90171 ||  || — || January 1, 2003 || Socorro || LINEAR || NYS || align=right | 1.4 km || 
|-id=172 bgcolor=#E9E9E9
| 90172 ||  || — || January 2, 2003 || Socorro || LINEAR || — || align=right | 4.3 km || 
|-id=173 bgcolor=#fefefe
| 90173 ||  || — || January 5, 2003 || Socorro || LINEAR || — || align=right | 1.7 km || 
|-id=174 bgcolor=#fefefe
| 90174 ||  || — || January 5, 2003 || Socorro || LINEAR || — || align=right | 2.0 km || 
|-id=175 bgcolor=#d6d6d6
| 90175 ||  || — || January 5, 2003 || Socorro || LINEAR || — || align=right | 5.3 km || 
|-id=176 bgcolor=#d6d6d6
| 90176 ||  || — || January 4, 2003 || Socorro || LINEAR || MEL || align=right | 7.6 km || 
|-id=177 bgcolor=#d6d6d6
| 90177 ||  || — || January 4, 2003 || Socorro || LINEAR || — || align=right | 6.8 km || 
|-id=178 bgcolor=#fefefe
| 90178 ||  || — || January 4, 2003 || Socorro || LINEAR || FLO || align=right | 1.4 km || 
|-id=179 bgcolor=#fefefe
| 90179 ||  || — || January 4, 2003 || Socorro || LINEAR || V || align=right | 1.6 km || 
|-id=180 bgcolor=#d6d6d6
| 90180 ||  || — || January 4, 2003 || Socorro || LINEAR || — || align=right | 4.3 km || 
|-id=181 bgcolor=#d6d6d6
| 90181 ||  || — || January 4, 2003 || Socorro || LINEAR || EOS || align=right | 4.6 km || 
|-id=182 bgcolor=#E9E9E9
| 90182 ||  || — || January 4, 2003 || Socorro || LINEAR || EUN || align=right | 2.9 km || 
|-id=183 bgcolor=#E9E9E9
| 90183 ||  || — || January 4, 2003 || Socorro || LINEAR || INO || align=right | 2.4 km || 
|-id=184 bgcolor=#E9E9E9
| 90184 ||  || — || January 5, 2003 || Socorro || LINEAR || — || align=right | 3.2 km || 
|-id=185 bgcolor=#E9E9E9
| 90185 ||  || — || January 7, 2003 || Socorro || LINEAR || — || align=right | 2.2 km || 
|-id=186 bgcolor=#fefefe
| 90186 ||  || — || January 7, 2003 || Socorro || LINEAR || V || align=right | 1.8 km || 
|-id=187 bgcolor=#E9E9E9
| 90187 ||  || — || January 7, 2003 || Socorro || LINEAR || — || align=right | 5.9 km || 
|-id=188 bgcolor=#E9E9E9
| 90188 ||  || — || January 7, 2003 || Socorro || LINEAR || — || align=right | 3.8 km || 
|-id=189 bgcolor=#fefefe
| 90189 ||  || — || January 7, 2003 || Socorro || LINEAR || — || align=right | 2.1 km || 
|-id=190 bgcolor=#d6d6d6
| 90190 ||  || — || January 7, 2003 || Socorro || LINEAR || — || align=right | 4.8 km || 
|-id=191 bgcolor=#fefefe
| 90191 ||  || — || January 7, 2003 || Socorro || LINEAR || — || align=right | 1.5 km || 
|-id=192 bgcolor=#d6d6d6
| 90192 ||  || — || January 7, 2003 || Socorro || LINEAR || — || align=right | 9.0 km || 
|-id=193 bgcolor=#fefefe
| 90193 ||  || — || January 5, 2003 || Socorro || LINEAR || — || align=right | 1.3 km || 
|-id=194 bgcolor=#fefefe
| 90194 ||  || — || January 5, 2003 || Socorro || LINEAR || — || align=right | 1.9 km || 
|-id=195 bgcolor=#E9E9E9
| 90195 ||  || — || January 5, 2003 || Socorro || LINEAR || — || align=right | 1.7 km || 
|-id=196 bgcolor=#fefefe
| 90196 ||  || — || January 5, 2003 || Socorro || LINEAR || NYS || align=right | 2.2 km || 
|-id=197 bgcolor=#E9E9E9
| 90197 ||  || — || January 5, 2003 || Socorro || LINEAR || MAR || align=right | 2.1 km || 
|-id=198 bgcolor=#E9E9E9
| 90198 ||  || — || January 5, 2003 || Socorro || LINEAR || — || align=right | 3.2 km || 
|-id=199 bgcolor=#d6d6d6
| 90199 ||  || — || January 8, 2003 || Socorro || LINEAR || — || align=right | 6.5 km || 
|-id=200 bgcolor=#E9E9E9
| 90200 ||  || — || January 8, 2003 || Socorro || LINEAR || HEN || align=right | 1.9 km || 
|}

90201–90300 

|-bgcolor=#E9E9E9
| 90201 ||  || — || January 7, 2003 || Socorro || LINEAR || — || align=right | 5.1 km || 
|-id=202 bgcolor=#E9E9E9
| 90202 ||  || — || January 7, 2003 || Socorro || LINEAR || — || align=right | 3.8 km || 
|-id=203 bgcolor=#E9E9E9
| 90203 ||  || — || January 9, 2003 || Socorro || LINEAR || EUN || align=right | 3.0 km || 
|-id=204 bgcolor=#d6d6d6
| 90204 ||  || — || January 10, 2003 || Socorro || LINEAR || — || align=right | 8.3 km || 
|-id=205 bgcolor=#fefefe
| 90205 ||  || — || January 6, 2003 || Needville || Needville Obs. || — || align=right | 2.0 km || 
|-id=206 bgcolor=#fefefe
| 90206 ||  || — || January 11, 2003 || Socorro || LINEAR || H || align=right | 1.6 km || 
|-id=207 bgcolor=#fefefe
| 90207 ||  || — || January 10, 2003 || Socorro || LINEAR || — || align=right | 2.6 km || 
|-id=208 bgcolor=#E9E9E9
| 90208 ||  || — || January 10, 2003 || Socorro || LINEAR || — || align=right | 3.5 km || 
|-id=209 bgcolor=#E9E9E9
| 90209 ||  || — || January 10, 2003 || Socorro || LINEAR || — || align=right | 3.9 km || 
|-id=210 bgcolor=#E9E9E9
| 90210 ||  || — || January 11, 2003 || Socorro || LINEAR || — || align=right | 5.1 km || 
|-id=211 bgcolor=#fefefe
| 90211 ||  || — || January 10, 2003 || Socorro || LINEAR || H || align=right | 1.6 km || 
|-id=212 bgcolor=#E9E9E9
| 90212 ||  || — || January 12, 2003 || Socorro || LINEAR || PAL || align=right | 4.8 km || 
|-id=213 bgcolor=#E9E9E9
| 90213 ||  || — || January 10, 2003 || Socorro || LINEAR || — || align=right | 4.1 km || 
|-id=214 bgcolor=#d6d6d6
| 90214 ||  || — || January 10, 2003 || Socorro || LINEAR || MEL || align=right | 5.4 km || 
|-id=215 bgcolor=#fefefe
| 90215 ||  || — || January 12, 2003 || Anderson Mesa || LONEOS || H || align=right | 1.3 km || 
|-id=216 bgcolor=#fefefe
| 90216 ||  || — || January 11, 2003 || Palomar || NEAT || H || align=right | 1.6 km || 
|-id=217 bgcolor=#fefefe
| 90217 ||  || — || January 1, 2003 || Socorro || LINEAR || — || align=right | 2.0 km || 
|-id=218 bgcolor=#d6d6d6
| 90218 || 2003 BC || — || January 16, 2003 || Anderson Mesa || LONEOS || — || align=right | 5.8 km || 
|-id=219 bgcolor=#d6d6d6
| 90219 ||  || — || January 25, 2003 || Anderson Mesa || LONEOS || — || align=right | 6.4 km || 
|-id=220 bgcolor=#E9E9E9
| 90220 ||  || — || January 26, 2003 || Haleakala || NEAT || MIT || align=right | 5.1 km || 
|-id=221 bgcolor=#d6d6d6
| 90221 ||  || — || January 26, 2003 || Anderson Mesa || LONEOS || — || align=right | 5.8 km || 
|-id=222 bgcolor=#d6d6d6
| 90222 ||  || — || January 26, 2003 || Anderson Mesa || LONEOS || — || align=right | 6.3 km || 
|-id=223 bgcolor=#fefefe
| 90223 ||  || — || January 26, 2003 || Anderson Mesa || LONEOS || — || align=right | 2.6 km || 
|-id=224 bgcolor=#fefefe
| 90224 ||  || — || January 26, 2003 || Haleakala || NEAT || FLO || align=right | 1.2 km || 
|-id=225 bgcolor=#fefefe
| 90225 ||  || — || January 26, 2003 || Haleakala || NEAT || — || align=right | 2.0 km || 
|-id=226 bgcolor=#d6d6d6
| 90226 Byronsmith ||  ||  || January 26, 2003 || Anderson Mesa || LONEOS || — || align=right | 5.6 km || 
|-id=227 bgcolor=#d6d6d6
| 90227 ||  || — || January 26, 2003 || Anderson Mesa || LONEOS || — || align=right | 7.9 km || 
|-id=228 bgcolor=#d6d6d6
| 90228 ||  || — || January 26, 2003 || Anderson Mesa || LONEOS || — || align=right | 4.3 km || 
|-id=229 bgcolor=#fefefe
| 90229 ||  || — || January 27, 2003 || Haleakala || NEAT || — || align=right | 4.3 km || 
|-id=230 bgcolor=#d6d6d6
| 90230 ||  || — || January 25, 2003 || Palomar || NEAT || — || align=right | 6.5 km || 
|-id=231 bgcolor=#E9E9E9
| 90231 ||  || — || January 25, 2003 || Palomar || NEAT || — || align=right | 3.5 km || 
|-id=232 bgcolor=#d6d6d6
| 90232 ||  || — || January 26, 2003 || Anderson Mesa || LONEOS || — || align=right | 7.8 km || 
|-id=233 bgcolor=#E9E9E9
| 90233 ||  || — || January 26, 2003 || Anderson Mesa || LONEOS || — || align=right | 3.8 km || 
|-id=234 bgcolor=#E9E9E9
| 90234 ||  || — || January 27, 2003 || Haleakala || NEAT || — || align=right | 3.7 km || 
|-id=235 bgcolor=#d6d6d6
| 90235 ||  || — || January 27, 2003 || Socorro || LINEAR || 7:4 || align=right | 8.8 km || 
|-id=236 bgcolor=#fefefe
| 90236 ||  || — || January 27, 2003 || Socorro || LINEAR || V || align=right | 1.2 km || 
|-id=237 bgcolor=#E9E9E9
| 90237 ||  || — || January 27, 2003 || Socorro || LINEAR || PAD || align=right | 3.4 km || 
|-id=238 bgcolor=#d6d6d6
| 90238 ||  || — || January 27, 2003 || Palomar || NEAT || — || align=right | 4.9 km || 
|-id=239 bgcolor=#E9E9E9
| 90239 ||  || — || January 29, 2003 || Palomar || NEAT || MAR || align=right | 2.3 km || 
|-id=240 bgcolor=#E9E9E9
| 90240 ||  || — || January 27, 2003 || Socorro || LINEAR || — || align=right | 3.8 km || 
|-id=241 bgcolor=#d6d6d6
| 90241 ||  || — || January 26, 2003 || Haleakala || NEAT || — || align=right | 3.9 km || 
|-id=242 bgcolor=#d6d6d6
| 90242 ||  || — || January 27, 2003 || Socorro || LINEAR || — || align=right | 5.8 km || 
|-id=243 bgcolor=#fefefe
| 90243 ||  || — || January 27, 2003 || Socorro || LINEAR || — || align=right | 5.5 km || 
|-id=244 bgcolor=#E9E9E9
| 90244 ||  || — || January 27, 2003 || Socorro || LINEAR || — || align=right | 3.8 km || 
|-id=245 bgcolor=#d6d6d6
| 90245 ||  || — || January 27, 2003 || Socorro || LINEAR || URS || align=right | 6.8 km || 
|-id=246 bgcolor=#E9E9E9
| 90246 ||  || — || January 27, 2003 || Haleakala || NEAT || — || align=right | 1.8 km || 
|-id=247 bgcolor=#fefefe
| 90247 ||  || — || January 27, 2003 || Haleakala || NEAT || — || align=right | 2.6 km || 
|-id=248 bgcolor=#fefefe
| 90248 ||  || — || January 28, 2003 || Kitt Peak || Spacewatch || NYS || align=right | 1.5 km || 
|-id=249 bgcolor=#E9E9E9
| 90249 ||  || — || January 28, 2003 || Palomar || NEAT || GEF || align=right | 2.8 km || 
|-id=250 bgcolor=#E9E9E9
| 90250 ||  || — || January 28, 2003 || Kitt Peak || Spacewatch || DOR || align=right | 6.6 km || 
|-id=251 bgcolor=#fefefe
| 90251 ||  || — || January 28, 2003 || Haleakala || NEAT || H || align=right | 1.3 km || 
|-id=252 bgcolor=#d6d6d6
| 90252 ||  || — || January 30, 2003 || Kitt Peak || Spacewatch || VER || align=right | 6.0 km || 
|-id=253 bgcolor=#E9E9E9
| 90253 ||  || — || January 30, 2003 || Anderson Mesa || LONEOS || — || align=right | 3.3 km || 
|-id=254 bgcolor=#fefefe
| 90254 ||  || — || January 28, 2003 || Socorro || LINEAR || — || align=right | 2.2 km || 
|-id=255 bgcolor=#d6d6d6
| 90255 ||  || — || January 30, 2003 || Anderson Mesa || LONEOS || — || align=right | 5.4 km || 
|-id=256 bgcolor=#fefefe
| 90256 ||  || — || January 28, 2003 || Socorro || LINEAR || — || align=right | 2.3 km || 
|-id=257 bgcolor=#d6d6d6
| 90257 ||  || — || January 28, 2003 || Palomar || NEAT || — || align=right | 4.2 km || 
|-id=258 bgcolor=#d6d6d6
| 90258 ||  || — || January 31, 2003 || Anderson Mesa || LONEOS || — || align=right | 8.4 km || 
|-id=259 bgcolor=#E9E9E9
| 90259 ||  || — || January 31, 2003 || Anderson Mesa || LONEOS || RAF || align=right | 4.4 km || 
|-id=260 bgcolor=#d6d6d6
| 90260 ||  || — || January 31, 2003 || Socorro || LINEAR || VER || align=right | 6.3 km || 
|-id=261 bgcolor=#E9E9E9
| 90261 ||  || — || January 31, 2003 || Socorro || LINEAR || GEF || align=right | 3.1 km || 
|-id=262 bgcolor=#d6d6d6
| 90262 ||  || — || January 26, 2003 || Kitt Peak || Spacewatch || EOS || align=right | 3.5 km || 
|-id=263 bgcolor=#d6d6d6
| 90263 || 2003 CO || — || February 1, 2003 || Anderson Mesa || LONEOS || — || align=right | 6.1 km || 
|-id=264 bgcolor=#d6d6d6
| 90264 ||  || — || February 1, 2003 || Socorro || LINEAR || — || align=right | 4.5 km || 
|-id=265 bgcolor=#fefefe
| 90265 ||  || — || February 1, 2003 || Socorro || LINEAR || DAT || align=right | 1.8 km || 
|-id=266 bgcolor=#fefefe
| 90266 ||  || — || February 1, 2003 || Socorro || LINEAR || NYS || align=right | 1.2 km || 
|-id=267 bgcolor=#d6d6d6
| 90267 ||  || — || February 1, 2003 || Socorro || LINEAR || VER || align=right | 5.9 km || 
|-id=268 bgcolor=#fefefe
| 90268 ||  || — || February 1, 2003 || Haleakala || NEAT || NYS || align=right | 1.6 km || 
|-id=269 bgcolor=#d6d6d6
| 90269 ||  || — || February 2, 2003 || Socorro || LINEAR || — || align=right | 6.5 km || 
|-id=270 bgcolor=#d6d6d6
| 90270 ||  || — || February 2, 2003 || Socorro || LINEAR || URS || align=right | 6.1 km || 
|-id=271 bgcolor=#fefefe
| 90271 ||  || — || February 2, 2003 || Haleakala || NEAT || V || align=right | 1.1 km || 
|-id=272 bgcolor=#d6d6d6
| 90272 ||  || — || February 7, 2003 || Desert Eagle || W. K. Y. Yeung || — || align=right | 3.8 km || 
|-id=273 bgcolor=#E9E9E9
| 90273 ||  || — || February 8, 2003 || Anderson Mesa || LONEOS || — || align=right | 2.5 km || 
|-id=274 bgcolor=#fefefe
| 90274 ||  || — || February 9, 2003 || Palomar || NEAT || V || align=right | 2.4 km || 
|-id=275 bgcolor=#d6d6d6
| 90275 || 2003 DM || — || February 19, 2003 || Haleakala || NEAT || HYG || align=right | 6.3 km || 
|-id=276 bgcolor=#E9E9E9
| 90276 ||  || — || February 22, 2003 || Desert Eagle || W. K. Y. Yeung || — || align=right | 3.3 km || 
|-id=277 bgcolor=#d6d6d6
| 90277 ||  || — || February 22, 2003 || Palomar || NEAT || SYL7:4 || align=right | 8.8 km || 
|-id=278 bgcolor=#d6d6d6
| 90278 Caprese ||  ||  || February 24, 2003 || Campo Imperatore || M. Di Martino, F. Bernardi || ALA || align=right | 9.2 km || 
|-id=279 bgcolor=#E9E9E9
| 90279 Devětsil ||  ||  || February 26, 2003 || Kleť || KLENOT || EUN || align=right | 3.5 km || 
|-id=280 bgcolor=#E9E9E9
| 90280 ||  || — || February 26, 2003 || Socorro || LINEAR || — || align=right | 4.7 km || 
|-id=281 bgcolor=#FA8072
| 90281 ||  || — || February 27, 2003 || Haleakala || NEAT || — || align=right | 1.9 km || 
|-id=282 bgcolor=#d6d6d6
| 90282 ||  || — || February 22, 2003 || Palomar || NEAT || THM || align=right | 5.9 km || 
|-id=283 bgcolor=#E9E9E9
| 90283 ||  || — || February 28, 2003 || Socorro || LINEAR || — || align=right | 2.5 km || 
|-id=284 bgcolor=#fefefe
| 90284 ||  || — || March 6, 2003 || Anderson Mesa || LONEOS || — || align=right | 2.3 km || 
|-id=285 bgcolor=#d6d6d6
| 90285 ||  || — || March 6, 2003 || Anderson Mesa || LONEOS || — || align=right | 6.3 km || 
|-id=286 bgcolor=#d6d6d6
| 90286 ||  || — || March 6, 2003 || Socorro || LINEAR || — || align=right | 6.1 km || 
|-id=287 bgcolor=#E9E9E9
| 90287 ||  || — || March 6, 2003 || Socorro || LINEAR || — || align=right | 4.3 km || 
|-id=288 bgcolor=#d6d6d6
| 90288 Dalleave ||  ||  || March 6, 2003 || Cima Ekar || ADAS || — || align=right | 7.3 km || 
|-id=289 bgcolor=#fefefe
| 90289 ||  || — || March 6, 2003 || Anderson Mesa || LONEOS || NYS || align=right | 1.7 km || 
|-id=290 bgcolor=#E9E9E9
| 90290 ||  || — || March 6, 2003 || Anderson Mesa || LONEOS || — || align=right | 3.6 km || 
|-id=291 bgcolor=#fefefe
| 90291 ||  || — || March 6, 2003 || Anderson Mesa || LONEOS || — || align=right | 1.9 km || 
|-id=292 bgcolor=#E9E9E9
| 90292 ||  || — || March 6, 2003 || Anderson Mesa || LONEOS || — || align=right | 3.4 km || 
|-id=293 bgcolor=#d6d6d6
| 90293 ||  || — || March 6, 2003 || Socorro || LINEAR || — || align=right | 6.6 km || 
|-id=294 bgcolor=#E9E9E9
| 90294 ||  || — || March 6, 2003 || Anderson Mesa || LONEOS || — || align=right | 1.7 km || 
|-id=295 bgcolor=#d6d6d6
| 90295 ||  || — || March 6, 2003 || Socorro || LINEAR || — || align=right | 5.7 km || 
|-id=296 bgcolor=#d6d6d6
| 90296 ||  || — || March 6, 2003 || Socorro || LINEAR || — || align=right | 6.6 km || 
|-id=297 bgcolor=#fefefe
| 90297 ||  || — || March 7, 2003 || Anderson Mesa || LONEOS || NYS || align=right | 1.5 km || 
|-id=298 bgcolor=#E9E9E9
| 90298 ||  || — || March 7, 2003 || Socorro || LINEAR || — || align=right | 2.9 km || 
|-id=299 bgcolor=#E9E9E9
| 90299 ||  || — || March 7, 2003 || Socorro || LINEAR || — || align=right | 3.5 km || 
|-id=300 bgcolor=#E9E9E9
| 90300 ||  || — || March 8, 2003 || Socorro || LINEAR || — || align=right | 6.6 km || 
|}

90301–90400 

|-bgcolor=#E9E9E9
| 90301 ||  || — || March 7, 2003 || Socorro || LINEAR || — || align=right | 4.5 km || 
|-id=302 bgcolor=#E9E9E9
| 90302 ||  || — || March 9, 2003 || Anderson Mesa || LONEOS || — || align=right | 4.8 km || 
|-id=303 bgcolor=#fefefe
| 90303 ||  || — || March 10, 2003 || Anderson Mesa || LONEOS || — || align=right | 2.1 km || 
|-id=304 bgcolor=#E9E9E9
| 90304 ||  || — || March 9, 2003 || Socorro || LINEAR || — || align=right | 7.7 km || 
|-id=305 bgcolor=#fefefe
| 90305 || 2003 FX || — || March 21, 2003 || Palomar || NEAT || PHO || align=right | 2.0 km || 
|-id=306 bgcolor=#d6d6d6
| 90306 ||  || — || March 26, 2003 || Socorro || LINEAR || ALA || align=right | 7.3 km || 
|-id=307 bgcolor=#d6d6d6
| 90307 ||  || — || March 23, 2003 || Kitt Peak || Spacewatch || — || align=right | 3.9 km || 
|-id=308 bgcolor=#E9E9E9
| 90308 Johney ||  ||  || March 23, 2003 || Catalina || CSS || — || align=right | 3.7 km || 
|-id=309 bgcolor=#d6d6d6
| 90309 ||  || — || March 23, 2003 || Palomar || NEAT || — || align=right | 4.7 km || 
|-id=310 bgcolor=#E9E9E9
| 90310 ||  || — || March 23, 2003 || Palomar || NEAT || — || align=right | 3.2 km || 
|-id=311 bgcolor=#E9E9E9
| 90311 ||  || — || March 25, 2003 || Palomar || NEAT || RAF || align=right | 2.2 km || 
|-id=312 bgcolor=#fefefe
| 90312 ||  || — || March 25, 2003 || Kitt Peak || Spacewatch || V || align=right | 1.2 km || 
|-id=313 bgcolor=#fefefe
| 90313 ||  || — || March 23, 2003 || Kitt Peak || Spacewatch || NYS || align=right | 1.6 km || 
|-id=314 bgcolor=#d6d6d6
| 90314 ||  || — || March 23, 2003 || Kitt Peak || Spacewatch || — || align=right | 6.2 km || 
|-id=315 bgcolor=#fefefe
| 90315 ||  || — || March 23, 2003 || Kitt Peak || Spacewatch || NYS || align=right | 1.4 km || 
|-id=316 bgcolor=#d6d6d6
| 90316 ||  || — || March 23, 2003 || Haleakala || NEAT || — || align=right | 8.1 km || 
|-id=317 bgcolor=#fefefe
| 90317 Williamcutlip ||  ||  || March 23, 2003 || Catalina || CSS || V || align=right | 1.3 km || 
|-id=318 bgcolor=#d6d6d6
| 90318 ||  || — || March 24, 2003 || Haleakala || NEAT || EOS || align=right | 3.9 km || 
|-id=319 bgcolor=#fefefe
| 90319 ||  || — || March 25, 2003 || Palomar || NEAT || — || align=right | 2.1 km || 
|-id=320 bgcolor=#fefefe
| 90320 ||  || — || March 26, 2003 || Palomar || NEAT || FLO || align=right | 1.1 km || 
|-id=321 bgcolor=#E9E9E9
| 90321 ||  || — || March 26, 2003 || Kitt Peak || Spacewatch || MAR || align=right | 2.6 km || 
|-id=322 bgcolor=#E9E9E9
| 90322 ||  || — || March 26, 2003 || Kitt Peak || Spacewatch || — || align=right | 4.1 km || 
|-id=323 bgcolor=#d6d6d6
| 90323 ||  || — || March 26, 2003 || Palomar || NEAT || — || align=right | 5.3 km || 
|-id=324 bgcolor=#d6d6d6
| 90324 ||  || — || March 26, 2003 || Palomar || NEAT || — || align=right | 3.5 km || 
|-id=325 bgcolor=#d6d6d6
| 90325 ||  || — || March 27, 2003 || Palomar || NEAT || — || align=right | 6.9 km || 
|-id=326 bgcolor=#fefefe
| 90326 ||  || — || March 27, 2003 || Kitt Peak || Spacewatch || — || align=right | 2.1 km || 
|-id=327 bgcolor=#E9E9E9
| 90327 ||  || — || March 27, 2003 || Palomar || NEAT || EUN || align=right | 3.1 km || 
|-id=328 bgcolor=#fefefe
| 90328 Haryou ||  ||  || March 28, 2003 || Catalina || CSS || V || align=right | 2.1 km || 
|-id=329 bgcolor=#fefefe
| 90329 ||  || — || March 28, 2003 || Kitt Peak || Spacewatch || V || align=right | 1.5 km || 
|-id=330 bgcolor=#fefefe
| 90330 ||  || — || March 29, 2003 || Anderson Mesa || LONEOS || V || align=right | 1.6 km || 
|-id=331 bgcolor=#fefefe
| 90331 ||  || — || March 29, 2003 || Anderson Mesa || LONEOS || — || align=right | 2.1 km || 
|-id=332 bgcolor=#E9E9E9
| 90332 ||  || — || March 29, 2003 || Anderson Mesa || LONEOS || MRX || align=right | 2.6 km || 
|-id=333 bgcolor=#d6d6d6
| 90333 ||  || — || March 29, 2003 || Anderson Mesa || LONEOS || — || align=right | 5.0 km || 
|-id=334 bgcolor=#fefefe
| 90334 ||  || — || March 29, 2003 || Socorro || LINEAR || — || align=right | 6.9 km || 
|-id=335 bgcolor=#d6d6d6
| 90335 ||  || — || March 30, 2003 || Anderson Mesa || LONEOS || — || align=right | 4.7 km || 
|-id=336 bgcolor=#d6d6d6
| 90336 ||  || — || March 30, 2003 || Kitt Peak || Spacewatch || — || align=right | 5.7 km || 
|-id=337 bgcolor=#C2FFFF
| 90337 ||  || — || March 30, 2003 || Anderson Mesa || LONEOS || L4 || align=right | 29 km || 
|-id=338 bgcolor=#fefefe
| 90338 ||  || — || March 31, 2003 || Anderson Mesa || LONEOS || V || align=right | 2.3 km || 
|-id=339 bgcolor=#d6d6d6
| 90339 ||  || — || March 25, 2003 || Kitt Peak || Spacewatch || — || align=right | 6.6 km || 
|-id=340 bgcolor=#E9E9E9
| 90340 ||  || — || March 27, 2003 || Anderson Mesa || LONEOS || — || align=right | 4.7 km || 
|-id=341 bgcolor=#fefefe
| 90341 ||  || — || April 1, 2003 || Socorro || LINEAR || — || align=right | 2.1 km || 
|-id=342 bgcolor=#d6d6d6
| 90342 ||  || — || April 2, 2003 || Haleakala || NEAT || — || align=right | 4.8 km || 
|-id=343 bgcolor=#E9E9E9
| 90343 ||  || — || April 3, 2003 || Anderson Mesa || LONEOS || HEN || align=right | 2.1 km || 
|-id=344 bgcolor=#fefefe
| 90344 ||  || — || April 1, 2003 || Socorro || LINEAR || V || align=right | 2.3 km || 
|-id=345 bgcolor=#fefefe
| 90345 ||  || — || April 1, 2003 || Socorro || LINEAR || V || align=right | 1.6 km || 
|-id=346 bgcolor=#E9E9E9
| 90346 ||  || — || April 3, 2003 || Anderson Mesa || LONEOS || — || align=right | 2.7 km || 
|-id=347 bgcolor=#E9E9E9
| 90347 ||  || — || April 8, 2003 || Socorro || LINEAR || — || align=right | 4.9 km || 
|-id=348 bgcolor=#d6d6d6
| 90348 ||  || — || April 5, 2003 || Anderson Mesa || LONEOS || TIR || align=right | 3.3 km || 
|-id=349 bgcolor=#d6d6d6
| 90349 ||  || — || April 8, 2003 || Socorro || LINEAR || — || align=right | 4.5 km || 
|-id=350 bgcolor=#E9E9E9
| 90350 ||  || — || April 6, 2003 || Anderson Mesa || LONEOS || — || align=right | 4.8 km || 
|-id=351 bgcolor=#d6d6d6
| 90351 ||  || — || April 9, 2003 || Palomar || NEAT || THB || align=right | 7.1 km || 
|-id=352 bgcolor=#d6d6d6
| 90352 ||  || — || April 8, 2003 || Socorro || LINEAR || — || align=right | 5.1 km || 
|-id=353 bgcolor=#d6d6d6
| 90353 ||  || — || April 7, 2003 || Socorro || LINEAR || — || align=right | 5.9 km || 
|-id=354 bgcolor=#fefefe
| 90354 ||  || — || April 7, 2003 || Socorro || LINEAR || — || align=right | 3.0 km || 
|-id=355 bgcolor=#E9E9E9
| 90355 ||  || — || April 25, 2003 || Anderson Mesa || LONEOS || EUN || align=right | 3.2 km || 
|-id=356 bgcolor=#fefefe
| 90356 ||  || — || April 24, 2003 || Kitt Peak || Spacewatch || — || align=right | 1.7 km || 
|-id=357 bgcolor=#E9E9E9
| 90357 ||  || — || April 26, 2003 || Haleakala || NEAT || — || align=right | 2.9 km || 
|-id=358 bgcolor=#d6d6d6
| 90358 ||  || — || April 27, 2003 || Socorro || LINEAR || TIR || align=right | 6.6 km || 
|-id=359 bgcolor=#d6d6d6
| 90359 ||  || — || April 28, 2003 || Socorro || LINEAR || EOS || align=right | 4.0 km || 
|-id=360 bgcolor=#d6d6d6
| 90360 ||  || — || April 29, 2003 || Socorro || LINEAR || — || align=right | 5.1 km || 
|-id=361 bgcolor=#fefefe
| 90361 ||  || — || April 30, 2003 || Socorro || LINEAR || — || align=right | 2.2 km || 
|-id=362 bgcolor=#d6d6d6
| 90362 ||  || — || April 30, 2003 || Kitt Peak || Spacewatch || — || align=right | 3.0 km || 
|-id=363 bgcolor=#d6d6d6
| 90363 ||  || — || April 30, 2003 || Haleakala || NEAT || — || align=right | 7.1 km || 
|-id=364 bgcolor=#E9E9E9
| 90364 ||  || — || May 2, 2003 || Socorro || LINEAR || AER || align=right | 5.1 km || 
|-id=365 bgcolor=#E9E9E9
| 90365 ||  || — || May 2, 2003 || Socorro || LINEAR || — || align=right | 3.2 km || 
|-id=366 bgcolor=#d6d6d6
| 90366 ||  || — || May 5, 2003 || Anderson Mesa || LONEOS || — || align=right | 5.7 km || 
|-id=367 bgcolor=#FFC2E0
| 90367 ||  || — || June 6, 2003 || Socorro || LINEAR || APO +1km || align=right | 1.7 km || 
|-id=368 bgcolor=#E9E9E9
| 90368 || 2003 MG || — || June 19, 2003 || Reedy Creek || J. Broughton || PAL || align=right | 7.6 km || 
|-id=369 bgcolor=#d6d6d6
| 90369 ||  || — || June 23, 2003 || Socorro || LINEAR || ALA || align=right | 6.6 km || 
|-id=370 bgcolor=#d6d6d6
| 90370 Jókaimór ||  ||  || July 7, 2003 || Piszkéstető || K. Sárneczky, B. Sipőcz || EOS || align=right | 3.4 km || 
|-id=371 bgcolor=#E9E9E9
| 90371 ||  || — || August 2, 2003 || Haleakala || NEAT || — || align=right | 5.5 km || 
|-id=372 bgcolor=#d6d6d6
| 90372 ||  || — || August 25, 2003 || Socorro || LINEAR || MEL || align=right | 12 km || 
|-id=373 bgcolor=#FFC2E0
| 90373 ||  || — || September 28, 2003 || Socorro || LINEAR || AMO || align=right data-sort-value="0.66" | 660 m || 
|-id=374 bgcolor=#d6d6d6
| 90374 ||  || — || October 17, 2003 || Anderson Mesa || LONEOS || LIX || align=right | 7.9 km || 
|-id=375 bgcolor=#d6d6d6
| 90375 ||  || — || October 25, 2003 || Socorro || LINEAR || EOS || align=right | 4.3 km || 
|-id=376 bgcolor=#d6d6d6
| 90376 Kossuth || 2003 VL ||  || November 5, 2003 || Piszkéstető || K. Sárneczky, S. Mészáros || — || align=right | 5.0 km || 
|-id=377 bgcolor=#C2E0FF
| 90377 Sedna ||  ||  || November 14, 2003 || Palomar || M. E. Brown, C. Trujillo, D. L. Rabinowitz || sednoid || align=right | 1025 km || 
|-id=378 bgcolor=#E9E9E9
| 90378 ||  || — || November 18, 2003 || Kitt Peak || Spacewatch || — || align=right | 3.6 km || 
|-id=379 bgcolor=#d6d6d6
| 90379 ||  || — || November 20, 2003 || Kitt Peak || Spacewatch || — || align=right | 7.7 km || 
|-id=380 bgcolor=#C2FFFF
| 90380 ||  || — || November 19, 2003 || Kitt Peak || Spacewatch || L5 || align=right | 18 km || 
|-id=381 bgcolor=#E9E9E9
| 90381 ||  || — || November 19, 2003 || Kitt Peak || Spacewatch || GEF || align=right | 2.8 km || 
|-id=382 bgcolor=#fefefe
| 90382 ||  || — || November 20, 2003 || Socorro || LINEAR || NYS || align=right | 1.1 km || 
|-id=383 bgcolor=#E9E9E9
| 90383 Johnloiacono ||  ||  || November 16, 2003 || Catalina || CSS || MIS || align=right | 4.1 km || 
|-id=384 bgcolor=#d6d6d6
| 90384 ||  || — || November 20, 2003 || Socorro || LINEAR || — || align=right | 6.4 km || 
|-id=385 bgcolor=#fefefe
| 90385 ||  || — || November 20, 2003 || Socorro || LINEAR || FLO || align=right | 1.4 km || 
|-id=386 bgcolor=#E9E9E9
| 90386 ||  || — || November 20, 2003 || Socorro || LINEAR || — || align=right | 2.0 km || 
|-id=387 bgcolor=#d6d6d6
| 90387 ||  || — || November 21, 2003 || Socorro || LINEAR || — || align=right | 4.1 km || 
|-id=388 bgcolor=#E9E9E9
| 90388 Philchristensen ||  ||  || November 24, 2003 || Catalina || CSS || MAR || align=right | 2.8 km || 
|-id=389 bgcolor=#E9E9E9
| 90389 ||  || — || November 28, 2003 || Anderson Mesa || LONEOS || GEF || align=right | 3.1 km || 
|-id=390 bgcolor=#E9E9E9
| 90390 ||  || — || December 1, 2003 || Kitt Peak || Spacewatch || — || align=right | 5.0 km || 
|-id=391 bgcolor=#fefefe
| 90391 ||  || — || December 1, 2003 || Socorro || LINEAR || FLO || align=right | 1.4 km || 
|-id=392 bgcolor=#E9E9E9
| 90392 ||  || — || December 14, 2003 || Socorro || LINEAR || GAL || align=right | 3.9 km || 
|-id=393 bgcolor=#E9E9E9
| 90393 ||  || — || December 15, 2003 || Socorro || LINEAR || — || align=right | 4.1 km || 
|-id=394 bgcolor=#E9E9E9
| 90394 ||  || — || December 15, 2003 || Socorro || LINEAR || HNS || align=right | 2.7 km || 
|-id=395 bgcolor=#fefefe
| 90395 ||  || — || December 1, 2003 || Socorro || LINEAR || PHO || align=right | 2.4 km || 
|-id=396 bgcolor=#E9E9E9
| 90396 Franklopez ||  ||  || December 16, 2003 || Catalina || R. Hill || — || align=right | 2.1 km || 
|-id=397 bgcolor=#E9E9E9
| 90397 Rasch ||  ||  || December 16, 2003 || Catalina || CSS || — || align=right | 1.8 km || 
|-id=398 bgcolor=#fefefe
| 90398 ||  || — || December 17, 2003 || Anderson Mesa || LONEOS || V || align=right | 1.5 km || 
|-id=399 bgcolor=#E9E9E9
| 90399 ||  || — || December 17, 2003 || Palomar || NEAT || — || align=right | 2.3 km || 
|-id=400 bgcolor=#fefefe
| 90400 ||  || — || December 18, 2003 || Kitt Peak || Spacewatch || V || align=right | 1.2 km || 
|}

90401–90500 

|-bgcolor=#fefefe
| 90401 ||  || — || December 19, 2003 || Socorro || LINEAR || — || align=right | 1.6 km || 
|-id=402 bgcolor=#d6d6d6
| 90402 ||  || — || December 19, 2003 || Socorro || LINEAR || — || align=right | 3.8 km || 
|-id=403 bgcolor=#FFC2E0
| 90403 ||  || — || December 21, 2003 || Catalina || CSS || APO +1kmPHAslow || align=right data-sort-value="0.57" | 570 m || 
|-id=404 bgcolor=#E9E9E9
| 90404 ||  || — || December 19, 2003 || Socorro || LINEAR || — || align=right | 1.9 km || 
|-id=405 bgcolor=#E9E9E9
| 90405 ||  || — || December 19, 2003 || Socorro || LINEAR || — || align=right | 5.0 km || 
|-id=406 bgcolor=#E9E9E9
| 90406 ||  || — || December 19, 2003 || Socorro || LINEAR || — || align=right | 2.2 km || 
|-id=407 bgcolor=#E9E9E9
| 90407 ||  || — || December 18, 2003 || Socorro || LINEAR || — || align=right | 4.9 km || 
|-id=408 bgcolor=#d6d6d6
| 90408 ||  || — || December 18, 2003 || Socorro || LINEAR || — || align=right | 4.5 km || 
|-id=409 bgcolor=#d6d6d6
| 90409 ||  || — || December 18, 2003 || Socorro || LINEAR || — || align=right | 5.8 km || 
|-id=410 bgcolor=#fefefe
| 90410 ||  || — || December 19, 2003 || Kitt Peak || Spacewatch || — || align=right | 1.9 km || 
|-id=411 bgcolor=#fefefe
| 90411 ||  || — || December 19, 2003 || Socorro || LINEAR || — || align=right | 1.7 km || 
|-id=412 bgcolor=#E9E9E9
| 90412 ||  || — || December 20, 2003 || Socorro || LINEAR || DOR || align=right | 5.3 km || 
|-id=413 bgcolor=#fefefe
| 90413 ||  || — || December 19, 2003 || Socorro || LINEAR || — || align=right | 3.9 km || 
|-id=414 bgcolor=#fefefe
| 90414 Karpov ||  ||  || December 19, 2003 || Pla D'Arguines || R. Ferrando || V || align=right | 1.4 km || 
|-id=415 bgcolor=#E9E9E9
| 90415 ||  || — || December 23, 2003 || Socorro || LINEAR || ADE || align=right | 4.8 km || 
|-id=416 bgcolor=#FFC2E0
| 90416 ||  || — || December 28, 2003 || Socorro || LINEAR || APOPHA || align=right data-sort-value="0.97" | 970 m || 
|-id=417 bgcolor=#fefefe
| 90417 ||  || — || December 27, 2003 || Kitt Peak || Spacewatch || — || align=right | 1.9 km || 
|-id=418 bgcolor=#d6d6d6
| 90418 ||  || — || December 27, 2003 || Kitt Peak || Spacewatch || KOR || align=right | 2.6 km || 
|-id=419 bgcolor=#fefefe
| 90419 ||  || — || December 27, 2003 || Socorro || LINEAR || NYS || align=right | 1.4 km || 
|-id=420 bgcolor=#d6d6d6
| 90420 ||  || — || December 27, 2003 || Kitt Peak || Spacewatch || KOR || align=right | 3.2 km || 
|-id=421 bgcolor=#E9E9E9
| 90421 ||  || — || December 27, 2003 || Haleakala || NEAT || EUN || align=right | 3.0 km || 
|-id=422 bgcolor=#E9E9E9
| 90422 ||  || — || December 28, 2003 || Socorro || LINEAR || EUN || align=right | 4.2 km || 
|-id=423 bgcolor=#E9E9E9
| 90423 ||  || — || December 29, 2003 || Socorro || LINEAR || MAR || align=right | 3.0 km || 
|-id=424 bgcolor=#E9E9E9
| 90424 ||  || — || December 29, 2003 || Socorro || LINEAR || MAR || align=right | 2.0 km || 
|-id=425 bgcolor=#E9E9E9
| 90425 ||  || — || January 13, 2004 || Anderson Mesa || LONEOS || — || align=right | 3.4 km || 
|-id=426 bgcolor=#fefefe
| 90426 ||  || — || January 13, 2004 || Anderson Mesa || LONEOS || V || align=right | 1.4 km || 
|-id=427 bgcolor=#E9E9E9
| 90427 ||  || — || January 16, 2004 || Palomar || NEAT || — || align=right | 3.2 km || 
|-id=428 bgcolor=#E9E9E9
| 90428 ||  || — || January 18, 2004 || Palomar || NEAT || — || align=right | 3.6 km || 
|-id=429 bgcolor=#fefefe
| 90429 Wetmore ||  ||  || January 19, 2004 || Catalina || CSS || MAS || align=right | 1.3 km || 
|-id=430 bgcolor=#E9E9E9
| 90430 ||  || — || January 22, 2004 || Socorro || LINEAR || JUN || align=right | 2.4 km || 
|-id=431 bgcolor=#d6d6d6
| 90431 ||  || — || January 23, 2004 || Anderson Mesa || LONEOS || — || align=right | 5.7 km || 
|-id=432 bgcolor=#fefefe
| 90432 ||  || — || January 23, 2004 || Anderson Mesa || LONEOS || — || align=right | 1.2 km || 
|-id=433 bgcolor=#fefefe
| 90433 ||  || — || January 22, 2004 || Socorro || LINEAR || — || align=right | 1.5 km || 
|-id=434 bgcolor=#E9E9E9
| 90434 ||  || — || January 20, 2004 || Kingsnake || J. V. McClusky || — || align=right | 2.2 km || 
|-id=435 bgcolor=#d6d6d6
| 90435 ||  || — || January 24, 2004 || Socorro || LINEAR || — || align=right | 5.1 km || 
|-id=436 bgcolor=#E9E9E9
| 90436 ||  || — || January 26, 2004 || Anderson Mesa || LONEOS || — || align=right | 3.5 km || 
|-id=437 bgcolor=#E9E9E9
| 90437 ||  || — || January 23, 2004 || Socorro || LINEAR || — || align=right | 3.7 km || 
|-id=438 bgcolor=#fefefe
| 90438 ||  || — || January 22, 2004 || Haleakala || NEAT || — || align=right | 2.7 km || 
|-id=439 bgcolor=#E9E9E9
| 90439 ||  || — || January 23, 2004 || Socorro || LINEAR || — || align=right | 3.2 km || 
|-id=440 bgcolor=#E9E9E9
| 90440 ||  || — || January 23, 2004 || Socorro || LINEAR || — || align=right | 4.1 km || 
|-id=441 bgcolor=#fefefe
| 90441 ||  || — || January 22, 2004 || Socorro || LINEAR || — || align=right | 2.0 km || 
|-id=442 bgcolor=#fefefe
| 90442 ||  || — || January 23, 2004 || Socorro || LINEAR || — || align=right | 1.8 km || 
|-id=443 bgcolor=#d6d6d6
| 90443 ||  || — || January 24, 2004 || Socorro || LINEAR || HYG || align=right | 6.2 km || 
|-id=444 bgcolor=#d6d6d6
| 90444 ||  || — || January 28, 2004 || Socorro || LINEAR || TIR || align=right | 4.5 km || 
|-id=445 bgcolor=#fefefe
| 90445 ||  || — || January 29, 2004 || Socorro || LINEAR || — || align=right | 1.6 km || 
|-id=446 bgcolor=#fefefe
| 90446 Truesdell ||  ||  || January 28, 2004 || Catalina || CSS || — || align=right | 2.3 km || 
|-id=447 bgcolor=#fefefe
| 90447 Emans ||  ||  || January 28, 2004 || Catalina || CSS || V || align=right | 1.3 km || 
|-id=448 bgcolor=#fefefe
| 90448 ||  || — || January 29, 2004 || Socorro || LINEAR || — || align=right | 2.0 km || 
|-id=449 bgcolor=#d6d6d6
| 90449 Brucestephenson ||  ||  || January 27, 2004 || Catalina || CSS || — || align=right | 7.1 km || 
|-id=450 bgcolor=#d6d6d6
| 90450 Cyriltyson ||  ||  || January 28, 2004 || Catalina || CSS || — || align=right | 4.2 km || 
|-id=451 bgcolor=#d6d6d6
| 90451 ||  || — || January 31, 2004 || Socorro || LINEAR || ALA || align=right | 9.7 km || 
|-id=452 bgcolor=#d6d6d6
| 90452 ||  || — || January 29, 2004 || Socorro || LINEAR || — || align=right | 7.6 km || 
|-id=453 bgcolor=#d6d6d6
| 90453 Shawnphillips || 2004 CM ||  || February 6, 2004 || Tenagra II || M. Schwartz, P. R. Holvorcem || — || align=right | 6.0 km || 
|-id=454 bgcolor=#fefefe
| 90454 || 2004 CV || — || February 10, 2004 || Desert Eagle || W. K. Y. Yeung || slow? || align=right | 2.4 km || 
|-id=455 bgcolor=#fefefe
| 90455 Irenehernandez ||  ||  || February 12, 2004 || Goodricke-Pigott || R. A. Tucker || — || align=right | 2.2 km || 
|-id=456 bgcolor=#d6d6d6
| 90456 ||  || — || February 13, 2004 || Goodricke-Pigott || R. A. Tucker || 3:2 || align=right | 10 km || 
|-id=457 bgcolor=#E9E9E9
| 90457 ||  || — || February 10, 2004 || Palomar || NEAT || — || align=right | 2.9 km || 
|-id=458 bgcolor=#d6d6d6
| 90458 ||  || — || February 11, 2004 || Palomar || NEAT || 7:4 || align=right | 5.6 km || 
|-id=459 bgcolor=#d6d6d6
| 90459 ||  || — || February 11, 2004 || Palomar || NEAT || — || align=right | 5.8 km || 
|-id=460 bgcolor=#fefefe
| 90460 ||  || — || February 13, 2004 || Palomar || NEAT || ERI || align=right | 3.5 km || 
|-id=461 bgcolor=#d6d6d6
| 90461 Matthewgraham ||  ||  || February 11, 2004 || Catalina || CSS || — || align=right | 3.6 km || 
|-id=462 bgcolor=#fefefe
| 90462 ||  || — || February 11, 2004 || Palomar || NEAT || PHO || align=right | 2.7 km || 
|-id=463 bgcolor=#d6d6d6
| 90463 Johnrichard ||  ||  || February 14, 2004 || Jornada || D. S. Dixon || EOS || align=right | 3.9 km || 
|-id=464 bgcolor=#fefefe
| 90464 ||  || — || February 10, 2004 || Palomar || NEAT || — || align=right | 3.9 km || 
|-id=465 bgcolor=#fefefe
| 90465 ||  || — || February 11, 2004 || Kitt Peak || Spacewatch || — || align=right | 1.4 km || 
|-id=466 bgcolor=#fefefe
| 90466 ||  || — || February 11, 2004 || Palomar || NEAT || ERI || align=right | 5.5 km || 
|-id=467 bgcolor=#fefefe
| 90467 ||  || — || February 13, 2004 || Palomar || NEAT || — || align=right | 2.0 km || 
|-id=468 bgcolor=#d6d6d6
| 90468 ||  || — || February 14, 2004 || Socorro || LINEAR || — || align=right | 3.2 km || 
|-id=469 bgcolor=#fefefe
| 90469 ||  || — || February 12, 2004 || Palomar || NEAT || — || align=right | 1.5 km || 
|-id=470 bgcolor=#fefefe
| 90470 ||  || — || February 13, 2004 || Palomar || NEAT || FLO || align=right | 1.6 km || 
|-id=471 bgcolor=#fefefe
| 90471 Andrewdrake ||  ||  || February 14, 2004 || Catalina || CSS || — || align=right | 1.9 km || 
|-id=472 bgcolor=#fefefe
| 90472 Mahabal ||  ||  || February 15, 2004 || Catalina || CSS || NYS || align=right | 1.4 km || 
|-id=473 bgcolor=#E9E9E9
| 90473 ||  || — || February 12, 2004 || Palomar || NEAT || — || align=right | 3.4 km || 
|-id=474 bgcolor=#fefefe
| 90474 ||  || — || February 13, 2004 || Palomar || NEAT || — || align=right | 1.9 km || 
|-id=475 bgcolor=#d6d6d6
| 90475 ||  || — || February 13, 2004 || Palomar || NEAT || — || align=right | 7.5 km || 
|-id=476 bgcolor=#fefefe
| 90476 ||  || — || February 13, 2004 || Palomar || NEAT || MAS || align=right | 1.7 km || 
|-id=477 bgcolor=#E9E9E9
| 90477 ||  || — || February 14, 2004 || Palomar || NEAT || — || align=right | 3.3 km || 
|-id=478 bgcolor=#d6d6d6
| 90478 ||  || — || February 15, 2004 || Palomar || NEAT || — || align=right | 9.9 km || 
|-id=479 bgcolor=#E9E9E9
| 90479 Donalek ||  ||  || February 15, 2004 || Catalina || CSS || — || align=right | 3.3 km || 
|-id=480 bgcolor=#d6d6d6
| 90480 Ulrich ||  ||  || February 15, 2004 || Catalina || CSS || LUT || align=right | 8.5 km || 
|-id=481 bgcolor=#E9E9E9
| 90481 Wollstonecraft || 2004 DA ||  || February 16, 2004 || Needville || J. Dellinger, D. Wells || — || align=right | 5.6 km || 
|-id=482 bgcolor=#C2E0FF
| 90482 Orcus || 2004 DW ||  || February 17, 2004 || Palomar || M. E. Brown, C. Trujillo, D. L. Rabinowitz || plutinomoon || align=right | 1550 km || 
|-id=483 bgcolor=#E9E9E9
| 90483 ||  || — || February 16, 2004 || Kitt Peak || Spacewatch || — || align=right | 4.7 km || 
|-id=484 bgcolor=#E9E9E9
| 90484 ||  || — || February 16, 2004 || Kitt Peak || Spacewatch || — || align=right | 1.9 km || 
|-id=485 bgcolor=#E9E9E9
| 90485 ||  || — || February 16, 2004 || Kitt Peak || Spacewatch || MIT || align=right | 6.7 km || 
|-id=486 bgcolor=#E9E9E9
| 90486 ||  || — || February 17, 2004 || Haleakala || NEAT || — || align=right | 3.5 km || 
|-id=487 bgcolor=#d6d6d6
| 90487 Witherspoon ||  ||  || February 16, 2004 || Catalina || CSS || ALA || align=right | 7.3 km || 
|-id=488 bgcolor=#E9E9E9
| 90488 ||  || — || February 16, 2004 || Catalina || CSS || — || align=right | 2.5 km || 
|-id=489 bgcolor=#fefefe
| 90489 ||  || — || February 17, 2004 || Socorro || LINEAR || NYS || align=right | 1.0 km || 
|-id=490 bgcolor=#d6d6d6
| 90490 ||  || — || February 17, 2004 || Socorro || LINEAR || — || align=right | 5.9 km || 
|-id=491 bgcolor=#E9E9E9
| 90491 ||  || — || February 18, 2004 || Socorro || LINEAR || DOR || align=right | 4.8 km || 
|-id=492 bgcolor=#E9E9E9
| 90492 ||  || — || February 19, 2004 || Socorro || LINEAR || EUN || align=right | 2.5 km || 
|-id=493 bgcolor=#E9E9E9
| 90493 ||  || — || February 19, 2004 || Socorro || LINEAR || EUN || align=right | 2.4 km || 
|-id=494 bgcolor=#fefefe
| 90494 ||  || — || February 18, 2004 || Socorro || LINEAR || NYS || align=right | 1.4 km || 
|-id=495 bgcolor=#fefefe
| 90495 ||  || — || February 23, 2004 || Socorro || LINEAR || NYS || align=right | 1.0 km || 
|-id=496 bgcolor=#fefefe
| 90496 ||  || — || February 19, 2004 || Socorro || LINEAR || ERI || align=right | 3.0 km || 
|-id=497 bgcolor=#E9E9E9
| 90497 ||  || — || February 23, 2004 || Socorro || LINEAR || — || align=right | 4.0 km || 
|-id=498 bgcolor=#fefefe
| 90498 ||  || — || February 17, 2004 || Socorro || LINEAR || H || align=right | 2.1 km || 
|-id=499 bgcolor=#fefefe
| 90499 ||  || — || March 12, 2004 || Palomar || NEAT || — || align=right | 1.7 km || 
|-id=500 bgcolor=#d6d6d6
| 90500 ||  || — || March 11, 2004 || Palomar || NEAT || — || align=right | 5.8 km || 
|}

90501–90600 

|-bgcolor=#d6d6d6
| 90501 ||  || — || March 11, 2004 || Palomar || NEAT || — || align=right | 6.4 km || 
|-id=502 bgcolor=#d6d6d6
| 90502 Buratti ||  ||  || March 12, 2004 || Palomar || NEAT || HIL3:2 || align=right | 9.1 km || 
|-id=503 bgcolor=#fefefe
| 90503 Japhethboyce ||  ||  || March 15, 2004 || Catalina || CSS || NYS || align=right | 1.7 km || 
|-id=504 bgcolor=#fefefe
| 90504 ||  || — || March 11, 2004 || Palomar || NEAT || V || align=right | 1.3 km || 
|-id=505 bgcolor=#fefefe
| 90505 ||  || — || March 12, 2004 || Cordell-Lorenz || Cordell–Lorenz Obs. || — || align=right | 1.8 km || 
|-id=506 bgcolor=#E9E9E9
| 90506 ||  || — || March 12, 2004 || Palomar || NEAT || GEF || align=right | 2.7 km || 
|-id=507 bgcolor=#E9E9E9
| 90507 ||  || — || March 12, 2004 || Palomar || NEAT || EUN || align=right | 3.0 km || 
|-id=508 bgcolor=#E9E9E9
| 90508 ||  || — || March 12, 2004 || Palomar || NEAT || EUN || align=right | 2.3 km || 
|-id=509 bgcolor=#E9E9E9
| 90509 ||  || — || March 13, 2004 || Palomar || NEAT || — || align=right | 3.6 km || 
|-id=510 bgcolor=#d6d6d6
| 90510 ||  || — || March 15, 2004 || Socorro || LINEAR || — || align=right | 7.7 km || 
|-id=511 bgcolor=#fefefe
| 90511 ||  || — || March 14, 2004 || Palomar || NEAT || — || align=right | 1.7 km || 
|-id=512 bgcolor=#E9E9E9
| 90512 ||  || — || March 13, 2004 || Palomar || NEAT || — || align=right | 4.3 km || 
|-id=513 bgcolor=#E9E9E9
| 90513 ||  || — || March 14, 2004 || Palomar || NEAT || ADE || align=right | 6.1 km || 
|-id=514 bgcolor=#d6d6d6
| 90514 ||  || — || March 15, 2004 || Socorro || LINEAR || — || align=right | 5.3 km || 
|-id=515 bgcolor=#fefefe
| 90515 ||  || — || March 14, 2004 || Palomar || NEAT || MAS || align=right | 1.3 km || 
|-id=516 bgcolor=#fefefe
| 90516 ||  || — || March 15, 2004 || Palomar || NEAT || — || align=right | 1.9 km || 
|-id=517 bgcolor=#fefefe
| 90517 ||  || — || March 15, 2004 || Palomar || NEAT || V || align=right | 1.2 km || 
|-id=518 bgcolor=#fefefe
| 90518 ||  || — || March 15, 2004 || Palomar || NEAT || — || align=right | 1.6 km || 
|-id=519 bgcolor=#E9E9E9
| 90519 ||  || — || March 13, 2004 || Palomar || NEAT || — || align=right | 9.7 km || 
|-id=520 bgcolor=#E9E9E9
| 90520 ||  || — || March 14, 2004 || Socorro || LINEAR || — || align=right | 2.4 km || 
|-id=521 bgcolor=#E9E9E9
| 90521 ||  || — || March 14, 2004 || Socorro || LINEAR || — || align=right | 3.4 km || 
|-id=522 bgcolor=#d6d6d6
| 90522 ||  || — || March 15, 2004 || Socorro || LINEAR || — || align=right | 7.9 km || 
|-id=523 bgcolor=#E9E9E9
| 90523 ||  || — || March 12, 2004 || Palomar || NEAT || MAR || align=right | 2.5 km || 
|-id=524 bgcolor=#E9E9E9
| 90524 ||  || — || March 15, 2004 || Socorro || LINEAR || — || align=right | 4.2 km || 
|-id=525 bgcolor=#fefefe
| 90525 Karijanberg ||  ||  || March 17, 2004 || Wrightwood || J. W. Young || — || align=right | 1.5 km || 
|-id=526 bgcolor=#fefefe
| 90526 Paullorenz ||  ||  || March 16, 2004 || Catalina || CSS || V || align=right | 1.3 km || 
|-id=527 bgcolor=#fefefe
| 90527 ||  || — || March 16, 2004 || Kitt Peak || Spacewatch || EUT || align=right | 1.2 km || 
|-id=528 bgcolor=#E9E9E9
| 90528 Raywhite ||  ||  || March 16, 2004 || Catalina || CSS || — || align=right | 2.7 km || 
|-id=529 bgcolor=#fefefe
| 90529 ||  || — || March 16, 2004 || Socorro || LINEAR || — || align=right | 4.2 km || 
|-id=530 bgcolor=#fefefe
| 90530 ||  || — || March 16, 2004 || Socorro || LINEAR || V || align=right | 1.5 km || 
|-id=531 bgcolor=#fefefe
| 90531 ||  || — || March 17, 2004 || Socorro || LINEAR || — || align=right | 1.3 km || 
|-id=532 bgcolor=#d6d6d6
| 90532 ||  || — || March 17, 2004 || Socorro || LINEAR || EUP || align=right | 9.6 km || 
|-id=533 bgcolor=#E9E9E9
| 90533 Laurentblind ||  ||  || March 28, 2004 || Ottmarsheim || C. Rinner || — || align=right | 2.9 km || 
|-id=534 bgcolor=#d6d6d6
| 90534 ||  || — || March 18, 2004 || Kitt Peak || Spacewatch || HYG || align=right | 5.8 km || 
|-id=535 bgcolor=#E9E9E9
| 90535 ||  || — || March 17, 2004 || Catalina || CSS || EUN || align=right | 2.2 km || 
|-id=536 bgcolor=#fefefe
| 90536 ||  || — || March 16, 2004 || Kitt Peak || Spacewatch || V || align=right | 1.5 km || 
|-id=537 bgcolor=#d6d6d6
| 90537 ||  || — || March 17, 2004 || Catalina || CSS || — || align=right | 5.3 km || 
|-id=538 bgcolor=#E9E9E9
| 90538 ||  || — || March 19, 2004 || Socorro || LINEAR || — || align=right | 3.0 km || 
|-id=539 bgcolor=#E9E9E9
| 90539 ||  || — || March 20, 2004 || Socorro || LINEAR || — || align=right | 2.5 km || 
|-id=540 bgcolor=#E9E9E9
| 90540 ||  || — || March 17, 2004 || Socorro || LINEAR || MAR || align=right | 2.1 km || 
|-id=541 bgcolor=#d6d6d6
| 90541 ||  || — || March 19, 2004 || Socorro || LINEAR || — || align=right | 6.3 km || 
|-id=542 bgcolor=#d6d6d6
| 90542 ||  || — || March 22, 2004 || Socorro || LINEAR || ALA || align=right | 10 km || 
|-id=543 bgcolor=#E9E9E9
| 90543 ||  || — || March 18, 2004 || Palomar || NEAT || — || align=right | 3.4 km || 
|-id=544 bgcolor=#d6d6d6
| 90544 ||  || — || March 23, 2004 || Socorro || LINEAR || — || align=right | 7.2 km || 
|-id=545 bgcolor=#fefefe
| 90545 ||  || — || March 23, 2004 || Socorro || LINEAR || — || align=right | 1.8 km || 
|-id=546 bgcolor=#fefefe
| 90546 ||  || — || March 24, 2004 || Anderson Mesa || LONEOS || MAS || align=right | 1.3 km || 
|-id=547 bgcolor=#d6d6d6
| 90547 ||  || — || March 24, 2004 || Anderson Mesa || LONEOS || — || align=right | 5.1 km || 
|-id=548 bgcolor=#fefefe
| 90548 ||  || — || March 24, 2004 || Anderson Mesa || LONEOS || V || align=right | 1.3 km || 
|-id=549 bgcolor=#fefefe
| 90549 ||  || — || March 25, 2004 || Anderson Mesa || LONEOS || — || align=right | 2.7 km || 
|-id=550 bgcolor=#E9E9E9
| 90550 ||  || — || March 23, 2004 || Socorro || LINEAR || GEF || align=right | 2.7 km || 
|-id=551 bgcolor=#d6d6d6
| 90551 ||  || — || March 23, 2004 || Socorro || LINEAR || Tj (2.95) || align=right | 3.7 km || 
|-id=552 bgcolor=#fefefe
| 90552 ||  || — || March 27, 2004 || Socorro || LINEAR || NYS || align=right | 1.3 km || 
|-id=553 bgcolor=#d6d6d6
| 90553 ||  || — || March 27, 2004 || Socorro || LINEAR || EOS || align=right | 3.9 km || 
|-id=554 bgcolor=#E9E9E9
| 90554 ||  || — || March 28, 2004 || Socorro || LINEAR || JUN || align=right | 2.0 km || 
|-id=555 bgcolor=#d6d6d6
| 90555 ||  || — || March 22, 2004 || Anderson Mesa || LONEOS || — || align=right | 3.6 km || 
|-id=556 bgcolor=#fefefe
| 90556 ||  || — || March 16, 2004 || Socorro || LINEAR || PHO || align=right | 1.9 km || 
|-id=557 bgcolor=#fefefe
| 90557 ||  || — || March 27, 2004 || Socorro || LINEAR || V || align=right | 1.8 km || 
|-id=558 bgcolor=#E9E9E9
| 90558 ||  || — || March 27, 2004 || Anderson Mesa || LONEOS || HNS || align=right | 4.2 km || 
|-id=559 bgcolor=#E9E9E9
| 90559 ||  || — || March 27, 2004 || Socorro || LINEAR || ADE || align=right | 5.2 km || 
|-id=560 bgcolor=#fefefe
| 90560 ||  || — || March 27, 2004 || Socorro || LINEAR || — || align=right | 2.2 km || 
|-id=561 bgcolor=#fefefe
| 90561 ||  || — || March 28, 2004 || Socorro || LINEAR || V || align=right | 1.6 km || 
|-id=562 bgcolor=#fefefe
| 90562 ||  || — || March 28, 2004 || Socorro || LINEAR || FLO || align=right | 1.5 km || 
|-id=563 bgcolor=#d6d6d6
| 90563 ||  || — || March 29, 2004 || Socorro || LINEAR || EUP || align=right | 7.2 km || 
|-id=564 bgcolor=#d6d6d6
| 90564 Markjarnyk ||  ||  || April 12, 2004 || Siding Spring || SSS || — || align=right | 8.1 km || 
|-id=565 bgcolor=#E9E9E9
| 90565 ||  || — || April 9, 2004 || Palomar || NEAT || ADE || align=right | 5.3 km || 
|-id=566 bgcolor=#d6d6d6
| 90566 ||  || — || April 11, 2004 || Palomar || NEAT || — || align=right | 7.2 km || 
|-id=567 bgcolor=#d6d6d6
| 90567 ||  || — || April 12, 2004 || Anderson Mesa || LONEOS || — || align=right | 4.3 km || 
|-id=568 bgcolor=#C2E0FF
| 90568 ||  || — || April 13, 2004 || Palomar || NEAT || other TNO || align=right | 696 km || 
|-id=569 bgcolor=#C2FFFF
| 90569 ||  || — || April 14, 2004 || Needville || Needville Obs. || L4 || align=right | 16 km || 
|-id=570 bgcolor=#fefefe
| 90570 ||  || — || April 14, 2004 || Socorro || LINEAR || H || align=right | 1.2 km || 
|-id=571 bgcolor=#E9E9E9
| 90571 ||  || — || April 14, 2004 || Socorro || LINEAR || — || align=right | 5.7 km || 
|-id=572 bgcolor=#d6d6d6
| 90572 ||  || — || April 11, 2004 || Palomar || NEAT || 7:4 || align=right | 9.4 km || 
|-id=573 bgcolor=#E9E9E9
| 90573 ||  || — || April 12, 2004 || Catalina || CSS || MAR || align=right | 2.3 km || 
|-id=574 bgcolor=#E9E9E9
| 90574 ||  || — || April 11, 2004 || Palomar || NEAT || ADE || align=right | 4.4 km || 
|-id=575 bgcolor=#fefefe
| 90575 ||  || — || April 12, 2004 || Kitt Peak || Spacewatch || NYS || align=right | 1.0 km || 
|-id=576 bgcolor=#d6d6d6
| 90576 ||  || — || April 10, 2004 || Catalina || CSS || — || align=right | 4.7 km || 
|-id=577 bgcolor=#fefefe
| 90577 ||  || — || April 12, 2004 || Palomar || NEAT || — || align=right | 1.6 km || 
|-id=578 bgcolor=#fefefe
| 90578 ||  || — || April 13, 2004 || Palomar || NEAT || — || align=right | 4.0 km || 
|-id=579 bgcolor=#E9E9E9
| 90579 Gordonnelson ||  ||  || April 15, 2004 || Catalina || CSS || — || align=right | 5.6 km || 
|-id=580 bgcolor=#E9E9E9
| 90580 ||  || — || April 15, 2004 || Anderson Mesa || LONEOS || — || align=right | 2.5 km || 
|-id=581 bgcolor=#d6d6d6
| 90581 ||  || — || April 17, 2004 || Socorro || LINEAR || — || align=right | 5.2 km || 
|-id=582 bgcolor=#d6d6d6
| 90582 ||  || — || April 20, 2004 || Socorro || LINEAR || — || align=right | 6.4 km || 
|-id=583 bgcolor=#E9E9E9
| 90583 ||  || — || April 24, 2004 || Haleakala || NEAT || — || align=right | 4.3 km || 
|-id=584 bgcolor=#fefefe
| 90584 || 2030 P-L || — || September 24, 1960 || Palomar || PLS || — || align=right | 1.8 km || 
|-id=585 bgcolor=#E9E9E9
| 90585 || 2032 P-L || — || September 24, 1960 || Palomar || PLS || slow? || align=right | 2.4 km || 
|-id=586 bgcolor=#fefefe
| 90586 || 2035 P-L || — || September 24, 1960 || Palomar || PLS || NYS || align=right | 1.4 km || 
|-id=587 bgcolor=#d6d6d6
| 90587 || 2182 P-L || — || September 24, 1960 || Palomar || PLS || HYG || align=right | 4.6 km || 
|-id=588 bgcolor=#fefefe
| 90588 || 2209 P-L || — || September 24, 1960 || Palomar || PLS || — || align=right | 2.0 km || 
|-id=589 bgcolor=#E9E9E9
| 90589 || 2587 P-L || — || September 24, 1960 || Palomar || PLS || — || align=right | 2.3 km || 
|-id=590 bgcolor=#fefefe
| 90590 || 2624 P-L || — || September 24, 1960 || Palomar || PLS || MAS || align=right | 1.6 km || 
|-id=591 bgcolor=#fefefe
| 90591 || 2659 P-L || — || September 24, 1960 || Palomar || PLS || — || align=right | 1.6 km || 
|-id=592 bgcolor=#E9E9E9
| 90592 || 2801 P-L || — || September 24, 1960 || Palomar || PLS || — || align=right | 1.9 km || 
|-id=593 bgcolor=#d6d6d6
| 90593 || 3003 P-L || — || September 24, 1960 || Palomar || PLS || TIR || align=right | 6.3 km || 
|-id=594 bgcolor=#d6d6d6
| 90594 || 3563 P-L || — || October 17, 1960 || Palomar || PLS || — || align=right | 7.6 km || 
|-id=595 bgcolor=#fefefe
| 90595 || 4033 P-L || — || September 24, 1960 || Palomar || PLS || NYS || align=right | 1.9 km || 
|-id=596 bgcolor=#d6d6d6
| 90596 || 4229 P-L || — || September 24, 1960 || Palomar || PLS || HYG || align=right | 4.7 km || 
|-id=597 bgcolor=#E9E9E9
| 90597 || 4248 P-L || — || September 24, 1960 || Palomar || PLS || — || align=right | 2.9 km || 
|-id=598 bgcolor=#E9E9E9
| 90598 || 4253 P-L || — || September 24, 1960 || Palomar || PLS || RAF || align=right | 1.9 km || 
|-id=599 bgcolor=#d6d6d6
| 90599 || 4542 P-L || — || September 24, 1960 || Palomar || PLS || — || align=right | 5.9 km || 
|-id=600 bgcolor=#fefefe
| 90600 || 4560 P-L || — || September 24, 1960 || Palomar || PLS || — || align=right | 4.6 km || 
|}

90601–90700 

|-bgcolor=#E9E9E9
| 90601 || 4718 P-L || — || September 24, 1960 || Palomar || PLS || — || align=right | 2.8 km || 
|-id=602 bgcolor=#d6d6d6
| 90602 || 4757 P-L || — || September 24, 1960 || Palomar || PLS || — || align=right | 5.0 km || 
|-id=603 bgcolor=#fefefe
| 90603 || 4760 P-L || — || September 24, 1960 || Palomar || PLS || KLI || align=right | 4.1 km || 
|-id=604 bgcolor=#fefefe
| 90604 || 4813 P-L || — || September 24, 1960 || Palomar || PLS || — || align=right | 1.8 km || 
|-id=605 bgcolor=#d6d6d6
| 90605 || 4814 P-L || — || September 24, 1960 || Palomar || PLS || KOR || align=right | 3.1 km || 
|-id=606 bgcolor=#E9E9E9
| 90606 || 4879 P-L || — || September 26, 1960 || Palomar || PLS || — || align=right | 2.1 km || 
|-id=607 bgcolor=#E9E9E9
| 90607 || 4918 P-L || — || September 24, 1960 || Palomar || PLS || — || align=right | 3.6 km || 
|-id=608 bgcolor=#fefefe
| 90608 || 5020 P-L || — || October 17, 1960 || Palomar || PLS || — || align=right | 2.3 km || 
|-id=609 bgcolor=#fefefe
| 90609 || 5027 P-L || — || October 17, 1960 || Palomar || PLS || — || align=right | 1.9 km || 
|-id=610 bgcolor=#fefefe
| 90610 || 6098 P-L || — || September 24, 1960 || Palomar || PLS || — || align=right | 1.4 km || 
|-id=611 bgcolor=#fefefe
| 90611 || 6100 P-L || — || September 24, 1960 || Palomar || PLS || V || align=right | 2.1 km || 
|-id=612 bgcolor=#fefefe
| 90612 || 6132 P-L || — || September 24, 1960 || Palomar || PLS || NYS || align=right | 1.1 km || 
|-id=613 bgcolor=#fefefe
| 90613 || 6187 P-L || — || September 24, 1960 || Palomar || PLS || — || align=right | 2.1 km || 
|-id=614 bgcolor=#E9E9E9
| 90614 || 6646 P-L || — || September 26, 1960 || Palomar || PLS || NEM || align=right | 5.5 km || 
|-id=615 bgcolor=#fefefe
| 90615 || 6762 P-L || — || September 24, 1960 || Palomar || PLS || — || align=right | 1.8 km || 
|-id=616 bgcolor=#d6d6d6
| 90616 || 6835 P-L || — || September 24, 1960 || Palomar || PLS || — || align=right | 4.8 km || 
|-id=617 bgcolor=#E9E9E9
| 90617 || 9589 P-L || — || October 17, 1960 || Palomar || PLS || VIB || align=right | 4.4 km || 
|-id=618 bgcolor=#fefefe
| 90618 || 1072 T-1 || — || March 25, 1971 || Palomar || PLS || NYS || align=right | 1.1 km || 
|-id=619 bgcolor=#fefefe
| 90619 || 1227 T-1 || — || March 25, 1971 || Palomar || PLS || — || align=right | 2.9 km || 
|-id=620 bgcolor=#E9E9E9
| 90620 || 4342 T-1 || — || March 26, 1971 || Palomar || PLS || — || align=right | 2.8 km || 
|-id=621 bgcolor=#fefefe
| 90621 || 1007 T-2 || — || September 29, 1973 || Palomar || PLS || — || align=right | 2.4 km || 
|-id=622 bgcolor=#E9E9E9
| 90622 || 1155 T-2 || — || September 29, 1973 || Palomar || PLS || — || align=right | 2.6 km || 
|-id=623 bgcolor=#E9E9E9
| 90623 || 1202 T-2 || — || September 29, 1973 || Palomar || PLS || KAZ || align=right | 2.0 km || 
|-id=624 bgcolor=#fefefe
| 90624 || 1270 T-2 || — || September 29, 1973 || Palomar || PLS || — || align=right | 1.3 km || 
|-id=625 bgcolor=#d6d6d6
| 90625 || 1336 T-2 || — || September 29, 1973 || Palomar || PLS || — || align=right | 3.9 km || 
|-id=626 bgcolor=#E9E9E9
| 90626 || 1483 T-2 || — || September 29, 1973 || Palomar || PLS || — || align=right | 6.4 km || 
|-id=627 bgcolor=#fefefe
| 90627 || 2090 T-2 || — || September 29, 1973 || Palomar || PLS || FLO || align=right | 1.1 km || 
|-id=628 bgcolor=#E9E9E9
| 90628 || 2135 T-2 || — || September 29, 1973 || Palomar || PLS || — || align=right | 4.6 km || 
|-id=629 bgcolor=#d6d6d6
| 90629 || 2149 T-2 || — || September 29, 1973 || Palomar || PLS || TIR || align=right | 3.5 km || 
|-id=630 bgcolor=#E9E9E9
| 90630 || 2159 T-2 || — || September 29, 1973 || Palomar || PLS || — || align=right | 2.4 km || 
|-id=631 bgcolor=#fefefe
| 90631 || 2213 T-2 || — || September 29, 1973 || Palomar || PLS || — || align=right | 2.3 km || 
|-id=632 bgcolor=#E9E9E9
| 90632 || 2259 T-2 || — || September 29, 1973 || Palomar || PLS || — || align=right | 2.2 km || 
|-id=633 bgcolor=#E9E9E9
| 90633 || 3040 T-2 || — || September 30, 1973 || Palomar || PLS || — || align=right | 4.4 km || 
|-id=634 bgcolor=#E9E9E9
| 90634 || 3046 T-2 || — || September 30, 1973 || Palomar || PLS || — || align=right | 2.0 km || 
|-id=635 bgcolor=#d6d6d6
| 90635 || 3068 T-2 || — || September 30, 1973 || Palomar || PLS || 628 || align=right | 3.6 km || 
|-id=636 bgcolor=#E9E9E9
| 90636 || 3250 T-2 || — || September 30, 1973 || Palomar || PLS || — || align=right | 4.1 km || 
|-id=637 bgcolor=#fefefe
| 90637 || 3340 T-2 || — || September 25, 1973 || Palomar || PLS || — || align=right | 1.8 km || 
|-id=638 bgcolor=#d6d6d6
| 90638 || 4048 T-2 || — || September 29, 1973 || Palomar || PLS || — || align=right | 8.5 km || 
|-id=639 bgcolor=#fefefe
| 90639 || 4151 T-2 || — || September 29, 1973 || Palomar || PLS || V || align=right | 1.4 km || 
|-id=640 bgcolor=#d6d6d6
| 90640 || 4500 T-2 || — || September 30, 1973 || Palomar || PLS || KAR || align=right | 2.4 km || 
|-id=641 bgcolor=#d6d6d6
| 90641 || 4570 T-2 || — || September 30, 1973 || Palomar || PLS || HYG || align=right | 6.1 km || 
|-id=642 bgcolor=#E9E9E9
| 90642 || 5093 T-2 || — || September 25, 1973 || Palomar || PLS || HNS || align=right | 2.7 km || 
|-id=643 bgcolor=#d6d6d6
| 90643 || 5166 T-2 || — || September 25, 1973 || Palomar || PLS || — || align=right | 5.9 km || 
|-id=644 bgcolor=#d6d6d6
| 90644 || 5483 T-2 || — || September 30, 1973 || Palomar || PLS || — || align=right | 8.0 km || 
|-id=645 bgcolor=#d6d6d6
| 90645 || 1004 T-3 || — || October 16, 1977 || Palomar || PLS || — || align=right | 6.9 km || 
|-id=646 bgcolor=#d6d6d6
| 90646 || 1008 T-3 || — || October 17, 1977 || Palomar || PLS || — || align=right | 6.0 km || 
|-id=647 bgcolor=#E9E9E9
| 90647 || 1016 T-3 || — || October 17, 1977 || Palomar || PLS || GEF || align=right | 5.2 km || 
|-id=648 bgcolor=#d6d6d6
| 90648 || 1030 T-3 || — || October 17, 1977 || Palomar || PLS || ALA || align=right | 7.5 km || 
|-id=649 bgcolor=#E9E9E9
| 90649 || 1041 T-3 || — || October 17, 1977 || Palomar || PLS || — || align=right | 3.1 km || 
|-id=650 bgcolor=#E9E9E9
| 90650 || 1112 T-3 || — || October 17, 1977 || Palomar || PLS || MAR || align=right | 2.0 km || 
|-id=651 bgcolor=#fefefe
| 90651 || 1219 T-3 || — || October 17, 1977 || Palomar || PLS || FLO || align=right | 2.0 km || 
|-id=652 bgcolor=#d6d6d6
| 90652 || 1224 T-3 || — || October 17, 1977 || Palomar || PLS || — || align=right | 6.3 km || 
|-id=653 bgcolor=#fefefe
| 90653 || 1904 T-3 || — || October 17, 1977 || Palomar || PLS || — || align=right | 2.1 km || 
|-id=654 bgcolor=#E9E9E9
| 90654 || 2067 T-3 || — || October 16, 1977 || Palomar || PLS || — || align=right | 2.0 km || 
|-id=655 bgcolor=#E9E9E9
| 90655 || 2144 T-3 || — || October 16, 1977 || Palomar || PLS || — || align=right | 5.6 km || 
|-id=656 bgcolor=#fefefe
| 90656 || 2399 T-3 || — || October 16, 1977 || Palomar || PLS || FLO || align=right | 1.4 km || 
|-id=657 bgcolor=#E9E9E9
| 90657 || 2414 T-3 || — || October 16, 1977 || Palomar || PLS || — || align=right | 5.3 km || 
|-id=658 bgcolor=#d6d6d6
| 90658 || 2455 T-3 || — || October 16, 1977 || Palomar || PLS || — || align=right | 3.0 km || 
|-id=659 bgcolor=#d6d6d6
| 90659 || 3175 T-3 || — || October 16, 1977 || Palomar || PLS || — || align=right | 6.2 km || 
|-id=660 bgcolor=#E9E9E9
| 90660 || 3314 T-3 || — || October 16, 1977 || Palomar || PLS || — || align=right | 5.3 km || 
|-id=661 bgcolor=#d6d6d6
| 90661 || 3853 T-3 || — || October 16, 1977 || Palomar || PLS || HYG || align=right | 6.7 km || 
|-id=662 bgcolor=#d6d6d6
| 90662 || 4087 T-3 || — || October 16, 1977 || Palomar || PLS || — || align=right | 4.0 km || 
|-id=663 bgcolor=#E9E9E9
| 90663 || 4257 T-3 || — || October 16, 1977 || Palomar || PLS || — || align=right | 2.9 km || 
|-id=664 bgcolor=#d6d6d6
| 90664 || 4283 T-3 || — || October 16, 1977 || Palomar || PLS || ALA || align=right | 7.4 km || 
|-id=665 bgcolor=#fefefe
| 90665 || 4299 T-3 || — || October 16, 1977 || Palomar || PLS || — || align=right | 2.3 km || 
|-id=666 bgcolor=#E9E9E9
| 90666 || 4374 T-3 || — || October 16, 1977 || Palomar || PLS || EUN || align=right | 3.1 km || 
|-id=667 bgcolor=#fefefe
| 90667 || 5011 T-3 || — || October 16, 1977 || Palomar || PLS || V || align=right | 1.6 km || 
|-id=668 bgcolor=#fefefe
| 90668 || 5075 T-3 || — || October 16, 1977 || Palomar || PLS || — || align=right | 1.7 km || 
|-id=669 bgcolor=#d6d6d6
| 90669 || 5181 T-3 || — || October 16, 1977 || Palomar || PLS || — || align=right | 4.7 km || 
|-id=670 bgcolor=#E9E9E9
| 90670 || 5183 T-3 || — || October 16, 1977 || Palomar || PLS || GEF || align=right | 2.5 km || 
|-id=671 bgcolor=#d6d6d6
| 90671 || 5728 T-3 || — || October 16, 1977 || Palomar || PLS || EOS || align=right | 5.1 km || 
|-id=672 bgcolor=#d6d6d6
| 90672 Metrorheinneckar || 1977 RH ||  || September 6, 1977 || La Silla || L. D. Schmadel || — || align=right | 5.4 km || 
|-id=673 bgcolor=#E9E9E9
| 90673 ||  || — || December 7, 1977 || Palomar || S. J. Bus || GEF || align=right | 2.7 km || 
|-id=674 bgcolor=#fefefe
| 90674 ||  || — || October 27, 1978 || Palomar || C. M. Olmstead || ERI || align=right | 3.7 km || 
|-id=675 bgcolor=#fefefe
| 90675 ||  || — || October 27, 1978 || Palomar || C. M. Olmstead || — || align=right | 1.7 km || 
|-id=676 bgcolor=#E9E9E9
| 90676 ||  || — || November 7, 1978 || Palomar || E. F. Helin, S. J. Bus || — || align=right | 1.6 km || 
|-id=677 bgcolor=#d6d6d6
| 90677 ||  || — || November 7, 1978 || Palomar || E. F. Helin, S. J. Bus || — || align=right | 5.7 km || 
|-id=678 bgcolor=#E9E9E9
| 90678 ||  || — || June 25, 1979 || Siding Spring || E. F. Helin, S. J. Bus || — || align=right | 4.2 km || 
|-id=679 bgcolor=#E9E9E9
| 90679 ||  || — || June 25, 1979 || Siding Spring || E. F. Helin, S. J. Bus || — || align=right | 1.5 km || 
|-id=680 bgcolor=#E9E9E9
| 90680 ||  || — || February 28, 1981 || Siding Spring || S. J. Bus || — || align=right | 3.2 km || 
|-id=681 bgcolor=#fefefe
| 90681 ||  || — || March 2, 1981 || Siding Spring || S. J. Bus || V || align=right | 2.0 km || 
|-id=682 bgcolor=#d6d6d6
| 90682 ||  || — || March 7, 1981 || Siding Spring || S. J. Bus || — || align=right | 5.7 km || 
|-id=683 bgcolor=#E9E9E9
| 90683 ||  || — || March 6, 1981 || Siding Spring || S. J. Bus || — || align=right | 3.2 km || 
|-id=684 bgcolor=#d6d6d6
| 90684 ||  || — || March 6, 1981 || Siding Spring || S. J. Bus || — || align=right | 7.9 km || 
|-id=685 bgcolor=#fefefe
| 90685 ||  || — || March 1, 1981 || Siding Spring || S. J. Bus || — || align=right | 1.7 km || 
|-id=686 bgcolor=#E9E9E9
| 90686 ||  || — || March 2, 1981 || Siding Spring || S. J. Bus || — || align=right | 2.3 km || 
|-id=687 bgcolor=#E9E9E9
| 90687 ||  || — || March 7, 1981 || Siding Spring || S. J. Bus || ADE || align=right | 3.5 km || 
|-id=688 bgcolor=#d6d6d6
| 90688 ||  || — || March 2, 1981 || Siding Spring || S. J. Bus || 7:4 || align=right | 8.7 km || 
|-id=689 bgcolor=#fefefe
| 90689 ||  || — || March 2, 1981 || Siding Spring || S. J. Bus || NYS || align=right | 2.7 km || 
|-id=690 bgcolor=#E9E9E9
| 90690 ||  || — || March 2, 1981 || Siding Spring || S. J. Bus || — || align=right | 3.9 km || 
|-id=691 bgcolor=#d6d6d6
| 90691 ||  || — || March 6, 1981 || Siding Spring || S. J. Bus || EOS || align=right | 4.1 km || 
|-id=692 bgcolor=#fefefe
| 90692 ||  || — || March 1, 1981 || Siding Spring || S. J. Bus || — || align=right | 1.6 km || 
|-id=693 bgcolor=#E9E9E9
| 90693 ||  || — || March 1, 1981 || Siding Spring || S. J. Bus || — || align=right | 2.3 km || 
|-id=694 bgcolor=#fefefe
| 90694 ||  || — || March 1, 1981 || Siding Spring || S. J. Bus || V || align=right | 1.2 km || 
|-id=695 bgcolor=#d6d6d6
| 90695 ||  || — || March 2, 1981 || Siding Spring || S. J. Bus || — || align=right | 5.3 km || 
|-id=696 bgcolor=#fefefe
| 90696 ||  || — || March 7, 1981 || Siding Spring || S. J. Bus || — || align=right | 1.5 km || 
|-id=697 bgcolor=#E9E9E9
| 90697 ||  || — || September 1, 1983 || La Silla || H. Debehogne || — || align=right | 3.8 km || 
|-id=698 bgcolor=#fefefe
| 90698 Kościuszko || 1984 EA ||  || March 1, 1984 || Anderson Mesa || E. Bowell || PHO || align=right | 3.6 km || 
|-id=699 bgcolor=#fefefe
| 90699 || 1986 QK || — || August 25, 1986 || La Silla || H. Debehogne || FLO || align=right | 2.3 km || 
|-id=700 bgcolor=#fefefe
| 90700 ||  || — || August 28, 1986 || La Silla || H. Debehogne || — || align=right | 1.8 km || 
|}

90701–90800 

|-bgcolor=#E9E9E9
| 90701 ||  || — || September 2, 1986 || La Silla || H. Debehogne || — || align=right | 6.8 km || 
|-id=702 bgcolor=#E9E9E9
| 90702 ||  || — || February 13, 1988 || La Silla || E. W. Elst || JUN || align=right | 2.3 km || 
|-id=703 bgcolor=#E9E9E9
| 90703 Indulgentia ||  ||  || September 8, 1988 || Tautenburg Observatory || F. Börngen || KAZ || align=right | 3.6 km || 
|-id=704 bgcolor=#d6d6d6
| 90704 ||  || — || September 14, 1988 || Cerro Tololo || S. J. Bus || 3:2 || align=right | 13 km || 
|-id=705 bgcolor=#E9E9E9
| 90705 ||  || — || January 4, 1989 || Siding Spring || R. H. McNaught || — || align=right | 2.0 km || 
|-id=706 bgcolor=#fefefe
| 90706 ||  || — || April 3, 1989 || La Silla || E. W. Elst || — || align=right | 1.4 km || 
|-id=707 bgcolor=#fefefe
| 90707 ||  || — || April 3, 1989 || La Silla || E. W. Elst || — || align=right | 1.6 km || 
|-id=708 bgcolor=#E9E9E9
| 90708 || 1990 EU || — || March 2, 1990 || La Silla || E. W. Elst || — || align=right | 4.5 km || 
|-id=709 bgcolor=#E9E9E9
| 90709 Wettin ||  ||  || October 12, 1990 || Tautenburg Observatory || F. Börngen, L. D. Schmadel || DOR || align=right | 4.4 km || 
|-id=710 bgcolor=#E9E9E9
| 90710 ||  || — || October 9, 1990 || Siding Spring || R. H. McNaught || — || align=right | 7.9 km || 
|-id=711 bgcolor=#fefefe
| 90711 Stotternheim ||  ||  || October 10, 1990 || Tautenburg Observatory || F. Börngen, L. D. Schmadel || FLO || align=right | 1.2 km || 
|-id=712 bgcolor=#E9E9E9
| 90712 Wittelsbach ||  ||  || October 12, 1990 || Tautenburg Observatory || F. Börngen, L. D. Schmadel || DOR || align=right | 5.4 km || 
|-id=713 bgcolor=#fefefe
| 90713 Chajnantor ||  ||  || November 11, 1990 || Geisei || T. Seki || FLO || align=right | 1.6 km || 
|-id=714 bgcolor=#d6d6d6
| 90714 ||  || — || November 15, 1990 || La Silla || E. W. Elst || — || align=right | 6.4 km || 
|-id=715 bgcolor=#fefefe
| 90715 ||  || — || April 8, 1991 || La Silla || E. W. Elst || NYS || align=right | 1.9 km || 
|-id=716 bgcolor=#fefefe
| 90716 ||  || — || April 8, 1991 || La Silla || E. W. Elst || — || align=right | 2.8 km || 
|-id=717 bgcolor=#E9E9E9
| 90717 Flanders ||  ||  || August 2, 1991 || La Silla || E. W. Elst || — || align=right | 3.2 km || 
|-id=718 bgcolor=#d6d6d6
| 90718 Castel Gandolfo ||  ||  || September 12, 1991 || Tautenburg Observatory || F. Börngen, L. D. Schmadel || — || align=right | 4.8 km || 
|-id=719 bgcolor=#E9E9E9
| 90719 ||  || — || September 13, 1991 || Palomar || H. E. Holt || — || align=right | 3.4 km || 
|-id=720 bgcolor=#E9E9E9
| 90720 ||  || — || September 14, 1991 || Palomar || H. E. Holt || — || align=right | 3.8 km || 
|-id=721 bgcolor=#E9E9E9
| 90721 ||  || — || September 13, 1991 || Palomar || H. E. Holt || — || align=right | 3.4 km || 
|-id=722 bgcolor=#E9E9E9
| 90722 ||  || — || October 10, 1991 || Palomar || K. J. Lawrence || — || align=right | 3.6 km || 
|-id=723 bgcolor=#E9E9E9
| 90723 ||  || — || October 10, 1991 || Kitt Peak || Spacewatch || HEN || align=right | 1.7 km || 
|-id=724 bgcolor=#E9E9E9
| 90724 ||  || — || November 4, 1991 || Kitt Peak || Spacewatch || — || align=right | 3.8 km || 
|-id=725 bgcolor=#E9E9E9
| 90725 ||  || — || November 4, 1991 || Kitt Peak || Spacewatch || — || align=right | 3.4 km || 
|-id=726 bgcolor=#fefefe
| 90726 ||  || — || January 29, 1992 || Kitt Peak || Spacewatch || — || align=right | 1.9 km || 
|-id=727 bgcolor=#d6d6d6
| 90727 ||  || — || February 29, 1992 || La Silla || UESAC || — || align=right | 5.7 km || 
|-id=728 bgcolor=#E9E9E9
| 90728 ||  || — || March 2, 1992 || La Silla || UESAC || — || align=right | 5.9 km || 
|-id=729 bgcolor=#fefefe
| 90729 ||  || — || March 2, 1992 || La Silla || UESAC || FLO || align=right | 1.5 km || 
|-id=730 bgcolor=#fefefe
| 90730 ||  || — || March 2, 1992 || La Silla || UESAC || — || align=right | 1.8 km || 
|-id=731 bgcolor=#E9E9E9
| 90731 || 1992 OC || — || July 26, 1992 || Siding Spring || R. H. McNaught || — || align=right | 2.6 km || 
|-id=732 bgcolor=#d6d6d6
| 90732 Opdebeeck || 1992 PO ||  || August 8, 1992 || Caussols || E. W. Elst || — || align=right | 6.8 km || 
|-id=733 bgcolor=#E9E9E9
| 90733 ||  || — || January 21, 1993 || Kitt Peak || Spacewatch || — || align=right | 3.7 km || 
|-id=734 bgcolor=#E9E9E9
| 90734 ||  || — || March 17, 1993 || La Silla || UESAC || NEM || align=right | 4.9 km || 
|-id=735 bgcolor=#E9E9E9
| 90735 ||  || — || March 17, 1993 || La Silla || UESAC || — || align=right | 5.8 km || 
|-id=736 bgcolor=#E9E9E9
| 90736 ||  || — || March 17, 1993 || La Silla || UESAC || GEF || align=right | 2.9 km || 
|-id=737 bgcolor=#d6d6d6
| 90737 ||  || — || March 17, 1993 || La Silla || UESAC || HIL3:2 || align=right | 12 km || 
|-id=738 bgcolor=#E9E9E9
| 90738 ||  || — || March 21, 1993 || La Silla || UESAC || — || align=right | 4.9 km || 
|-id=739 bgcolor=#fefefe
| 90739 ||  || — || March 19, 1993 || La Silla || UESAC || — || align=right | 2.6 km || 
|-id=740 bgcolor=#E9E9E9
| 90740 ||  || — || March 19, 1993 || La Silla || UESAC || — || align=right | 4.4 km || 
|-id=741 bgcolor=#d6d6d6
| 90741 ||  || — || March 19, 1993 || La Silla || UESAC || — || align=right | 4.7 km || 
|-id=742 bgcolor=#fefefe
| 90742 ||  || — || March 19, 1993 || La Silla || UESAC || V || align=right | 1.2 km || 
|-id=743 bgcolor=#E9E9E9
| 90743 ||  || — || March 19, 1993 || La Silla || UESAC || AGN || align=right | 2.2 km || 
|-id=744 bgcolor=#E9E9E9
| 90744 ||  || — || March 18, 1993 || La Silla || UESAC || — || align=right | 3.8 km || 
|-id=745 bgcolor=#E9E9E9
| 90745 ||  || — || April 19, 1993 || Kitt Peak || Spacewatch || GEF || align=right | 2.5 km || 
|-id=746 bgcolor=#fefefe
| 90746 ||  || — || July 12, 1993 || La Silla || E. W. Elst || V || align=right | 1.3 km || 
|-id=747 bgcolor=#d6d6d6
| 90747 ||  || — || August 15, 1993 || Kitt Peak || Spacewatch || — || align=right | 8.2 km || 
|-id=748 bgcolor=#fefefe
| 90748 ||  || — || August 18, 1993 || Caussols || E. W. Elst || NYS || align=right | 1.6 km || 
|-id=749 bgcolor=#d6d6d6
| 90749 ||  || — || August 20, 1993 || La Silla || E. W. Elst || — || align=right | 5.9 km || 
|-id=750 bgcolor=#d6d6d6
| 90750 ||  || — || August 20, 1993 || La Silla || E. W. Elst || — || align=right | 6.6 km || 
|-id=751 bgcolor=#fefefe
| 90751 ||  || — || August 20, 1993 || La Silla || E. W. Elst || FLO || align=right | 1.8 km || 
|-id=752 bgcolor=#fefefe
| 90752 ||  || — || September 15, 1993 || Kitt Peak || Spacewatch || — || align=right | 1.4 km || 
|-id=753 bgcolor=#fefefe
| 90753 ||  || — || September 15, 1993 || La Silla || E. W. Elst || — || align=right | 1.8 km || 
|-id=754 bgcolor=#fefefe
| 90754 ||  || — || September 15, 1993 || La Silla || E. W. Elst || FLO || align=right | 1.9 km || 
|-id=755 bgcolor=#d6d6d6
| 90755 ||  || — || September 15, 1993 || La Silla || E. W. Elst || — || align=right | 4.9 km || 
|-id=756 bgcolor=#fefefe
| 90756 ||  || — || September 14, 1993 || La Silla || H. Debehogne, E. W. Elst || NYS || align=right | 1.4 km || 
|-id=757 bgcolor=#fefefe
| 90757 ||  || — || September 14, 1993 || La Silla || H. Debehogne, E. W. Elst || FLO || align=right | 1.5 km || 
|-id=758 bgcolor=#fefefe
| 90758 ||  || — || September 15, 1993 || La Silla || E. W. Elst || V || align=right | 1.5 km || 
|-id=759 bgcolor=#fefefe
| 90759 ||  || — || September 17, 1993 || La Silla || E. W. Elst || — || align=right | 1.6 km || 
|-id=760 bgcolor=#fefefe
| 90760 ||  || — || September 22, 1993 || La Silla || H. Debehogne, E. W. Elst || NYS || align=right | 1.2 km || 
|-id=761 bgcolor=#fefefe
| 90761 ||  || — || September 16, 1993 || La Silla || H. Debehogne, E. W. Elst || — || align=right | 1.7 km || 
|-id=762 bgcolor=#d6d6d6
| 90762 ||  || — || October 8, 1993 || Kitt Peak || Spacewatch || HYG || align=right | 6.5 km || 
|-id=763 bgcolor=#d6d6d6
| 90763 ||  || — || October 9, 1993 || Kitt Peak || Spacewatch || HYG || align=right | 5.3 km || 
|-id=764 bgcolor=#fefefe
| 90764 ||  || — || October 9, 1993 || Kitt Peak || Spacewatch || — || align=right | 1.4 km || 
|-id=765 bgcolor=#d6d6d6
| 90765 ||  || — || October 9, 1993 || La Silla || E. W. Elst || THM || align=right | 5.1 km || 
|-id=766 bgcolor=#fefefe
| 90766 ||  || — || October 9, 1993 || La Silla || E. W. Elst || — || align=right | 1.6 km || 
|-id=767 bgcolor=#fefefe
| 90767 ||  || — || October 9, 1993 || La Silla || E. W. Elst || V || align=right | 1.5 km || 
|-id=768 bgcolor=#d6d6d6
| 90768 ||  || — || October 9, 1993 || La Silla || E. W. Elst || LIX || align=right | 8.3 km || 
|-id=769 bgcolor=#d6d6d6
| 90769 ||  || — || October 9, 1993 || La Silla || E. W. Elst || — || align=right | 5.3 km || 
|-id=770 bgcolor=#fefefe
| 90770 ||  || — || October 9, 1993 || La Silla || E. W. Elst || PHO || align=right | 2.4 km || 
|-id=771 bgcolor=#fefefe
| 90771 ||  || — || October 9, 1993 || La Silla || E. W. Elst || — || align=right | 2.0 km || 
|-id=772 bgcolor=#d6d6d6
| 90772 || 1993 UH || — || October 19, 1993 || Palomar || E. F. Helin || — || align=right | 8.3 km || 
|-id=773 bgcolor=#fefefe
| 90773 ||  || — || October 20, 1993 || Kitt Peak || Spacewatch || NYS || align=right | 1.2 km || 
|-id=774 bgcolor=#d6d6d6
| 90774 ||  || — || October 20, 1993 || La Silla || E. W. Elst || — || align=right | 6.4 km || 
|-id=775 bgcolor=#fefefe
| 90775 ||  || — || October 20, 1993 || La Silla || E. W. Elst || — || align=right | 1.7 km || 
|-id=776 bgcolor=#fefefe
| 90776 ||  || — || November 11, 1993 || Kushiro || S. Ueda, H. Kaneda || ERI || align=right | 3.7 km || 
|-id=777 bgcolor=#fefefe
| 90777 ||  || — || December 10, 1993 || Palomar || C. S. Shoemaker || PHO || align=right | 2.9 km || 
|-id=778 bgcolor=#fefefe
| 90778 ||  || — || February 10, 1994 || Kitt Peak || Spacewatch || V || align=right | 1.2 km || 
|-id=779 bgcolor=#E9E9E9
| 90779 ||  || — || February 8, 1994 || La Silla || E. W. Elst || — || align=right | 5.4 km || 
|-id=780 bgcolor=#fefefe
| 90780 ||  || — || February 8, 1994 || La Silla || E. W. Elst || — || align=right | 2.8 km || 
|-id=781 bgcolor=#E9E9E9
| 90781 ||  || — || March 9, 1994 || Caussols || E. W. Elst || — || align=right | 2.7 km || 
|-id=782 bgcolor=#E9E9E9
| 90782 ||  || — || April 6, 1994 || Kitt Peak || Spacewatch || HEN || align=right | 1.5 km || 
|-id=783 bgcolor=#E9E9E9
| 90783 ||  || — || April 6, 1994 || Kitt Peak || Spacewatch || — || align=right | 2.7 km || 
|-id=784 bgcolor=#E9E9E9
| 90784 || 1994 HZ || — || April 16, 1994 || Kitt Peak || Spacewatch || — || align=right | 2.1 km || 
|-id=785 bgcolor=#E9E9E9
| 90785 ||  || — || May 2, 1994 || Kitt Peak || Spacewatch || — || align=right | 4.7 km || 
|-id=786 bgcolor=#d6d6d6
| 90786 ||  || — || August 10, 1994 || La Silla || E. W. Elst || — || align=right | 4.2 km || 
|-id=787 bgcolor=#fefefe
| 90787 ||  || — || August 12, 1994 || La Silla || E. W. Elst || V || align=right data-sort-value="0.92" | 920 m || 
|-id=788 bgcolor=#fefefe
| 90788 ||  || — || August 12, 1994 || La Silla || E. W. Elst || — || align=right | 1.1 km || 
|-id=789 bgcolor=#fefefe
| 90789 ||  || — || August 12, 1994 || La Silla || E. W. Elst || — || align=right | 1.8 km || 
|-id=790 bgcolor=#d6d6d6
| 90790 ||  || — || August 12, 1994 || La Silla || E. W. Elst || KOR || align=right | 3.1 km || 
|-id=791 bgcolor=#FA8072
| 90791 ||  || — || August 12, 1994 || La Silla || E. W. Elst || — || align=right | 1.4 km || 
|-id=792 bgcolor=#fefefe
| 90792 ||  || — || August 12, 1994 || La Silla || E. W. Elst || — || align=right | 1.5 km || 
|-id=793 bgcolor=#fefefe
| 90793 ||  || — || August 10, 1994 || La Silla || E. W. Elst || — || align=right data-sort-value="0.95" | 950 m || 
|-id=794 bgcolor=#d6d6d6
| 90794 ||  || — || September 5, 1994 || La Silla || E. W. Elst || — || align=right | 4.6 km || 
|-id=795 bgcolor=#d6d6d6
| 90795 ||  || — || September 28, 1994 || Kitt Peak || Spacewatch || EOS || align=right | 3.2 km || 
|-id=796 bgcolor=#d6d6d6
| 90796 ||  || — || September 29, 1994 || Kitt Peak || Spacewatch || KOR || align=right | 2.8 km || 
|-id=797 bgcolor=#fefefe
| 90797 ||  || — || September 29, 1994 || Kitt Peak || Spacewatch || — || align=right | 2.4 km || 
|-id=798 bgcolor=#fefefe
| 90798 ||  || — || October 28, 1994 || Kitt Peak || Spacewatch || V || align=right data-sort-value="0.94" | 940 m || 
|-id=799 bgcolor=#fefefe
| 90799 ||  || — || October 28, 1994 || Kitt Peak || Spacewatch || FLO || align=right | 1.2 km || 
|-id=800 bgcolor=#fefefe
| 90800 ||  || — || October 28, 1994 || Kitt Peak || Spacewatch || FLO || align=right | 1.6 km || 
|}

90801–90900 

|-bgcolor=#fefefe
| 90801 ||  || — || November 9, 1994 || Kitt Peak || Spacewatch || — || align=right | 1.5 km || 
|-id=802 bgcolor=#fefefe
| 90802 || 1994 WY || — || November 25, 1994 || Oizumi || T. Kobayashi || — || align=right | 2.5 km || 
|-id=803 bgcolor=#fefefe
| 90803 ||  || — || November 28, 1994 || Kitt Peak || Spacewatch || NYS || align=right | 4.2 km || 
|-id=804 bgcolor=#d6d6d6
| 90804 ||  || — || November 28, 1994 || Kitt Peak || Spacewatch || TEL || align=right | 2.6 km || 
|-id=805 bgcolor=#d6d6d6
| 90805 ||  || — || November 28, 1994 || Kitt Peak || Spacewatch || — || align=right | 3.8 km || 
|-id=806 bgcolor=#fefefe
| 90806 Rudaki || 1995 AE ||  || January 4, 1995 || Colleverde || V. S. Casulli || — || align=right | 3.0 km || 
|-id=807 bgcolor=#fefefe
| 90807 ||  || — || February 1, 1995 || Kitt Peak || Spacewatch || NYS || align=right | 1.3 km || 
|-id=808 bgcolor=#d6d6d6
| 90808 ||  || — || February 1, 1995 || Kitt Peak || Spacewatch || — || align=right | 5.1 km || 
|-id=809 bgcolor=#fefefe
| 90809 ||  || — || February 24, 1995 || Siding Spring || R. H. McNaught || H || align=right data-sort-value="0.93" | 930 m || 
|-id=810 bgcolor=#fefefe
| 90810 ||  || — || February 24, 1995 || Siding Spring || R. H. McNaught || H || align=right data-sort-value="0.76" | 760 m || 
|-id=811 bgcolor=#fefefe
| 90811 ||  || — || February 22, 1995 || Kitt Peak || Spacewatch || — || align=right | 1.5 km || 
|-id=812 bgcolor=#fefefe
| 90812 ||  || — || March 2, 1995 || Kitt Peak || Spacewatch || NYS || align=right | 2.4 km || 
|-id=813 bgcolor=#fefefe
| 90813 ||  || — || March 2, 1995 || Kitt Peak || Spacewatch || — || align=right | 1.8 km || 
|-id=814 bgcolor=#d6d6d6
| 90814 ||  || — || March 23, 1995 || Kitt Peak || Spacewatch || HYG || align=right | 5.2 km || 
|-id=815 bgcolor=#fefefe
| 90815 ||  || — || March 23, 1995 || Kitt Peak || Spacewatch || — || align=right | 2.2 km || 
|-id=816 bgcolor=#E9E9E9
| 90816 ||  || — || July 22, 1995 || Kitt Peak || Spacewatch || — || align=right | 5.2 km || 
|-id=817 bgcolor=#E9E9E9
| 90817 Doylehall || 1995 RO ||  || September 1, 1995 || Haleakala || AMOS || — || align=right | 4.5 km || 
|-id=818 bgcolor=#E9E9E9
| 90818 Daverichards || 1995 RR ||  || September 14, 1995 || Haleakala || AMOS || — || align=right | 4.3 km || 
|-id=819 bgcolor=#E9E9E9
| 90819 || 1995 SN || — || September 18, 1995 || Ondřejov || L. Kotková || DOR || align=right | 4.4 km || 
|-id=820 bgcolor=#E9E9E9
| 90820 McCann ||  ||  || September 20, 1995 || Haleakala || AMOS || — || align=right | 2.7 km || 
|-id=821 bgcolor=#E9E9E9
| 90821 ||  || — || September 26, 1995 || Kleť || Kleť Obs. || — || align=right | 2.5 km || 
|-id=822 bgcolor=#E9E9E9
| 90822 ||  || — || September 19, 1995 || Kitt Peak || Spacewatch || AGN || align=right | 1.9 km || 
|-id=823 bgcolor=#E9E9E9
| 90823 ||  || — || September 26, 1995 || Kitt Peak || Spacewatch || — || align=right | 2.9 km || 
|-id=824 bgcolor=#E9E9E9
| 90824 ||  || — || September 28, 1995 || Xinglong || SCAP || — || align=right | 3.1 km || 
|-id=825 bgcolor=#E9E9E9
| 90825 Lizhensheng ||  ||  || September 28, 1995 || Xinglong || SCAP || — || align=right | 3.2 km || 
|-id=826 bgcolor=#E9E9E9
| 90826 Xuzhihong ||  ||  || October 14, 1995 || Xinglong || SCAP || — || align=right | 3.3 km || 
|-id=827 bgcolor=#E9E9E9
| 90827 ||  || — || October 15, 1995 || Kitt Peak || Spacewatch || AGN || align=right | 2.0 km || 
|-id=828 bgcolor=#E9E9E9
| 90828 ||  || — || October 23, 1995 || Kleť || Kleť Obs. || — || align=right | 3.8 km || 
|-id=829 bgcolor=#E9E9E9
| 90829 ||  || — || October 21, 1995 || Kushiro || S. Ueda, H. Kaneda || ADE || align=right | 6.9 km || 
|-id=830 bgcolor=#E9E9E9
| 90830 Beihang ||  ||  || October 25, 1995 || Xinglong || SCAP || — || align=right | 3.9 km || 
|-id=831 bgcolor=#E9E9E9
| 90831 ||  || — || October 17, 1995 || Kitt Peak || Spacewatch || — || align=right | 5.6 km || 
|-id=832 bgcolor=#E9E9E9
| 90832 ||  || — || October 17, 1995 || Kitt Peak || Spacewatch || PAD || align=right | 4.1 km || 
|-id=833 bgcolor=#E9E9E9
| 90833 ||  || — || October 18, 1995 || Kitt Peak || Spacewatch || — || align=right | 4.3 km || 
|-id=834 bgcolor=#E9E9E9
| 90834 ||  || — || October 20, 1995 || Caussols || E. W. Elst || WAT || align=right | 4.2 km || 
|-id=835 bgcolor=#E9E9E9
| 90835 ||  || — || October 20, 1995 || Kitt Peak || Spacewatch || — || align=right | 2.9 km || 
|-id=836 bgcolor=#E9E9E9
| 90836 ||  || — || November 14, 1995 || Kitt Peak || Spacewatch || AGN || align=right | 2.5 km || 
|-id=837 bgcolor=#E9E9E9
| 90837 Raoulvalentini ||  ||  || November 18, 1995 || Bologna || San Vittore Obs. || DOR || align=right | 5.8 km || 
|-id=838 bgcolor=#E9E9E9
| 90838 ||  || — || November 21, 1995 || Nanyo || T. Okuni || — || align=right | 6.4 km || 
|-id=839 bgcolor=#E9E9E9
| 90839 ||  || — || November 27, 1995 || Oizumi || T. Kobayashi || — || align=right | 4.9 km || 
|-id=840 bgcolor=#E9E9E9
| 90840 ||  || — || November 16, 1995 || Kitt Peak || Spacewatch || — || align=right | 4.6 km || 
|-id=841 bgcolor=#E9E9E9
| 90841 ||  || — || November 16, 1995 || Kitt Peak || Spacewatch || — || align=right | 4.8 km || 
|-id=842 bgcolor=#d6d6d6
| 90842 ||  || — || December 16, 1995 || Kitt Peak || Spacewatch || KOR || align=right | 2.6 km || 
|-id=843 bgcolor=#fefefe
| 90843 ||  || — || December 21, 1995 || Haleakala || NEAT || — || align=right | 1.8 km || 
|-id=844 bgcolor=#fefefe
| 90844 ||  || — || January 12, 1996 || Kiso || Kiso Obs. || — || align=right | 1.3 km || 
|-id=845 bgcolor=#d6d6d6
| 90845 ||  || — || January 18, 1996 || Kitt Peak || Spacewatch || — || align=right | 4.4 km || 
|-id=846 bgcolor=#d6d6d6
| 90846 || 1996 DY || — || February 21, 1996 || Oizumi || T. Kobayashi || — || align=right | 8.4 km || 
|-id=847 bgcolor=#d6d6d6
| 90847 ||  || — || March 11, 1996 || Kitt Peak || Spacewatch || URS || align=right | 7.2 km || 
|-id=848 bgcolor=#fefefe
| 90848 ||  || — || March 11, 1996 || Kitt Peak || Spacewatch || — || align=right | 1.7 km || 
|-id=849 bgcolor=#fefefe
| 90849 ||  || — || March 12, 1996 || Kitt Peak || Spacewatch || — || align=right | 1.3 km || 
|-id=850 bgcolor=#fefefe
| 90850 ||  || — || March 16, 1996 || Haleakala || AMOS || FLO || align=right | 1.4 km || 
|-id=851 bgcolor=#fefefe
| 90851 || 1996 GX || — || April 7, 1996 || Xinglong || SCAP || FLO || align=right | 1.3 km || 
|-id=852 bgcolor=#fefefe
| 90852 ||  || — || April 11, 1996 || Kitt Peak || Spacewatch || FLO || align=right | 2.4 km || 
|-id=853 bgcolor=#fefefe
| 90853 ||  || — || April 11, 1996 || Kitt Peak || Spacewatch || — || align=right | 1.4 km || 
|-id=854 bgcolor=#fefefe
| 90854 ||  || — || April 13, 1996 || Kitt Peak || Spacewatch || — || align=right | 1.9 km || 
|-id=855 bgcolor=#fefefe
| 90855 ||  || — || April 13, 1996 || Kitt Peak || Spacewatch || FLO || align=right | 1.4 km || 
|-id=856 bgcolor=#fefefe
| 90856 ||  || — || April 15, 1996 || La Silla || E. W. Elst || FLO || align=right | 1.5 km || 
|-id=857 bgcolor=#fefefe
| 90857 ||  || — || April 17, 1996 || La Silla || E. W. Elst || NYS || align=right | 1.4 km || 
|-id=858 bgcolor=#d6d6d6
| 90858 ||  || — || April 18, 1996 || La Silla || E. W. Elst || HYG || align=right | 6.1 km || 
|-id=859 bgcolor=#fefefe
| 90859 ||  || — || April 18, 1996 || La Silla || E. W. Elst || — || align=right | 1.8 km || 
|-id=860 bgcolor=#fefefe
| 90860 ||  || — || April 18, 1996 || La Silla || E. W. Elst || MAS || align=right | 1.6 km || 
|-id=861 bgcolor=#fefefe
| 90861 || 1996 JD || — || May 7, 1996 || Prescott || P. G. Comba || — || align=right | 1.7 km || 
|-id=862 bgcolor=#fefefe
| 90862 ||  || — || May 22, 1996 || Macquarie || R. H. McNaught, J. B. Child || — || align=right | 2.4 km || 
|-id=863 bgcolor=#fefefe
| 90863 ||  || — || August 17, 1996 || Church Stretton || S. P. Laurie || V || align=right | 1.8 km || 
|-id=864 bgcolor=#E9E9E9
| 90864 ||  || — || September 9, 1996 || Prescott || P. G. Comba || RAF || align=right | 1.5 km || 
|-id=865 bgcolor=#fefefe
| 90865 ||  || — || September 8, 1996 || Kitt Peak || Spacewatch || MAS || align=right | 1.5 km || 
|-id=866 bgcolor=#fefefe
| 90866 ||  || — || September 10, 1996 || La Silla || UDTS || H || align=right | 1.5 km || 
|-id=867 bgcolor=#E9E9E9
| 90867 ||  || — || September 21, 1996 || Xinglong || SCAP || — || align=right | 5.0 km || 
|-id=868 bgcolor=#E9E9E9
| 90868 ||  || — || September 18, 1996 || Xinglong || SCAP || — || align=right | 2.7 km || 
|-id=869 bgcolor=#fefefe
| 90869 ||  || — || October 4, 1996 || Kitt Peak || Spacewatch || FLO || align=right | 1.2 km || 
|-id=870 bgcolor=#E9E9E9
| 90870 ||  || — || October 4, 1996 || Kitt Peak || Spacewatch || — || align=right | 1.7 km || 
|-id=871 bgcolor=#fefefe
| 90871 ||  || — || October 4, 1996 || Kitt Peak || Spacewatch || H || align=right | 1.6 km || 
|-id=872 bgcolor=#E9E9E9
| 90872 ||  || — || October 8, 1996 || La Silla || E. W. Elst || EUN || align=right | 4.0 km || 
|-id=873 bgcolor=#E9E9E9
| 90873 ||  || — || October 6, 1996 || Kitt Peak || Spacewatch || — || align=right | 1.3 km || 
|-id=874 bgcolor=#E9E9E9
| 90874 ||  || — || October 3, 1996 || La Silla || E. W. Elst || — || align=right | 4.3 km || 
|-id=875 bgcolor=#E9E9E9
| 90875 Hoshitori ||  ||  || November 3, 1996 || Saji || Saji Obs. || — || align=right | 6.5 km || 
|-id=876 bgcolor=#E9E9E9
| 90876 ||  || — || November 13, 1996 || Oizumi || T. Kobayashi || — || align=right | 3.9 km || 
|-id=877 bgcolor=#E9E9E9
| 90877 ||  || — || November 14, 1996 || Oohira || T. Urata || — || align=right | 2.5 km || 
|-id=878 bgcolor=#E9E9E9
| 90878 ||  || — || November 1, 1996 || Xinglong || SCAP || — || align=right | 1.8 km || 
|-id=879 bgcolor=#fefefe
| 90879 ||  || — || November 19, 1996 || Oizumi || T. Kobayashi || — || align=right | 6.2 km || 
|-id=880 bgcolor=#E9E9E9
| 90880 ||  || — || November 30, 1996 || Chichibu || N. Satō || — || align=right | 3.8 km || 
|-id=881 bgcolor=#E9E9E9
| 90881 ||  || — || December 3, 1996 || Nachi-Katsuura || Y. Shimizu, T. Urata || — || align=right | 2.5 km || 
|-id=882 bgcolor=#E9E9E9
| 90882 ||  || — || December 9, 1996 || Kitt Peak || Spacewatch || — || align=right | 3.1 km || 
|-id=883 bgcolor=#E9E9E9
| 90883 ||  || — || December 8, 1996 || Chichibu || N. Satō || — || align=right | 4.3 km || 
|-id=884 bgcolor=#E9E9E9
| 90884 ||  || — || December 12, 1996 || Kitt Peak || Spacewatch || — || align=right | 4.7 km || 
|-id=885 bgcolor=#E9E9E9
| 90885 ||  || — || December 29, 1996 || Oizumi || T. Kobayashi || GEF || align=right | 2.9 km || 
|-id=886 bgcolor=#E9E9E9
| 90886 ||  || — || December 18, 1996 || Prescott || P. G. Comba || — || align=right | 2.6 km || 
|-id=887 bgcolor=#E9E9E9
| 90887 ||  || — || January 3, 1997 || Oizumi || T. Kobayashi || — || align=right | 3.2 km || 
|-id=888 bgcolor=#E9E9E9
| 90888 ||  || — || January 4, 1997 || Oizumi || T. Kobayashi || — || align=right | 3.6 km || 
|-id=889 bgcolor=#E9E9E9
| 90889 ||  || — || January 3, 1997 || Kitt Peak || Spacewatch || — || align=right | 2.8 km || 
|-id=890 bgcolor=#E9E9E9
| 90890 ||  || — || January 10, 1997 || Oizumi || T. Kobayashi || — || align=right | 6.9 km || 
|-id=891 bgcolor=#E9E9E9
| 90891 ||  || — || January 13, 1997 || Oizumi || T. Kobayashi || EUN || align=right | 2.7 km || 
|-id=892 bgcolor=#E9E9E9
| 90892 Betlémská kaple || 1997 BC ||  || January 16, 1997 || Kleť || M. Tichý || HOF || align=right | 4.5 km || 
|-id=893 bgcolor=#d6d6d6
| 90893 || 1997 BE || — || January 16, 1997 || Kleť || Kleť Obs. || EOS || align=right | 3.1 km || 
|-id=894 bgcolor=#E9E9E9
| 90894 ||  || — || January 28, 1997 || Farra d'Isonzo || Farra d'Isonzo || — || align=right | 5.4 km || 
|-id=895 bgcolor=#E9E9E9
| 90895 ||  || — || February 2, 1997 || Kitt Peak || Spacewatch || WIT || align=right | 2.0 km || 
|-id=896 bgcolor=#E9E9E9
| 90896 ||  || — || February 3, 1997 || Haleakala || NEAT || — || align=right | 4.8 km || 
|-id=897 bgcolor=#E9E9E9
| 90897 ||  || — || February 1, 1997 || Xinglong || SCAP || — || align=right | 5.7 km || 
|-id=898 bgcolor=#E9E9E9
| 90898 ||  || — || February 11, 1997 || Oizumi || T. Kobayashi || — || align=right | 3.9 km || 
|-id=899 bgcolor=#E9E9E9
| 90899 ||  || — || March 3, 1997 || Kitt Peak || Spacewatch || — || align=right | 1.8 km || 
|-id=900 bgcolor=#E9E9E9
| 90900 ||  || — || March 4, 1997 || Kitt Peak || Spacewatch || HEN || align=right | 2.6 km || 
|}

90901–91000 

|-bgcolor=#d6d6d6
| 90901 ||  || — || March 4, 1997 || Kitt Peak || Spacewatch || THM || align=right | 5.7 km || 
|-id=902 bgcolor=#d6d6d6
| 90902 ||  || — || March 4, 1997 || Kitt Peak || Spacewatch || KOR || align=right | 2.5 km || 
|-id=903 bgcolor=#d6d6d6
| 90903 ||  || — || March 2, 1997 || Kitt Peak || Spacewatch || — || align=right | 4.4 km || 
|-id=904 bgcolor=#d6d6d6
| 90904 ||  || — || March 4, 1997 || Xinglong || SCAP || — || align=right | 9.8 km || 
|-id=905 bgcolor=#E9E9E9
| 90905 ||  || — || March 4, 1997 || Kitt Peak || Spacewatch || — || align=right | 2.2 km || 
|-id=906 bgcolor=#E9E9E9
| 90906 ||  || — || March 5, 1997 || Socorro || LINEAR || — || align=right | 3.8 km || 
|-id=907 bgcolor=#d6d6d6
| 90907 || 1997 GX || — || April 3, 1997 || Kleť || Kleť Obs. || — || align=right | 4.8 km || 
|-id=908 bgcolor=#d6d6d6
| 90908 ||  || — || April 2, 1997 || Kitt Peak || Spacewatch || — || align=right | 5.0 km || 
|-id=909 bgcolor=#d6d6d6
| 90909 ||  || — || April 7, 1997 || Kitt Peak || Spacewatch || — || align=right | 3.9 km || 
|-id=910 bgcolor=#d6d6d6
| 90910 ||  || — || April 2, 1997 || Socorro || LINEAR || EUP || align=right | 6.9 km || 
|-id=911 bgcolor=#d6d6d6
| 90911 ||  || — || April 3, 1997 || Socorro || LINEAR || — || align=right | 4.3 km || 
|-id=912 bgcolor=#d6d6d6
| 90912 ||  || — || April 3, 1997 || Socorro || LINEAR || — || align=right | 5.0 km || 
|-id=913 bgcolor=#d6d6d6
| 90913 ||  || — || April 30, 1997 || Socorro || LINEAR || — || align=right | 9.8 km || 
|-id=914 bgcolor=#d6d6d6
| 90914 ||  || — || April 30, 1997 || Socorro || LINEAR || — || align=right | 6.8 km || 
|-id=915 bgcolor=#fefefe
| 90915 ||  || — || April 30, 1997 || Socorro || LINEAR || — || align=right | 1.0 km || 
|-id=916 bgcolor=#FA8072
| 90916 || 1997 LR || — || June 1, 1997 || Kitt Peak || Spacewatch || — || align=right | 1.6 km || 
|-id=917 bgcolor=#fefefe
| 90917 ||  || — || July 2, 1997 || Kitt Peak || Spacewatch || FLO || align=right | 2.6 km || 
|-id=918 bgcolor=#fefefe
| 90918 Jasinski ||  ||  || August 2, 1997 || Castres || A. Klotz || FLO || align=right | 1.8 km || 
|-id=919 bgcolor=#fefefe
| 90919 ||  || — || August 11, 1997 || Xinglong || SCAP || — || align=right | 2.2 km || 
|-id=920 bgcolor=#fefefe
| 90920 ||  || — || August 30, 1997 || Caussols || ODAS || — || align=right | 2.7 km || 
|-id=921 bgcolor=#fefefe
| 90921 ||  || — || August 22, 1997 || Woomera || F. B. Zoltowski || — || align=right | 2.2 km || 
|-id=922 bgcolor=#fefefe
| 90922 ||  || — || September 4, 1997 || Caussols || ODAS || — || align=right | 1.6 km || 
|-id=923 bgcolor=#fefefe
| 90923 ||  || — || September 1, 1997 || Caussols || ODAS || NYS || align=right | 1.3 km || 
|-id=924 bgcolor=#fefefe
| 90924 ||  || — || September 1, 1997 || Caussols || ODAS || NYS || align=right | 1.1 km || 
|-id=925 bgcolor=#fefefe
| 90925 ||  || — || September 8, 1997 || Yatsuka || H. Abe || — || align=right | 1.7 km || 
|-id=926 bgcolor=#fefefe
| 90926 Stáhalík ||  ||  || September 22, 1997 || Kleť || M. Tichý || FLO || align=right | 2.1 km || 
|-id=927 bgcolor=#fefefe
| 90927 ||  || — || September 25, 1997 || Dossobuono || L. Lai || — || align=right | 1.7 km || 
|-id=928 bgcolor=#fefefe
| 90928 ||  || — || September 27, 1997 || Kitt Peak || Spacewatch || — || align=right | 1.4 km || 
|-id=929 bgcolor=#fefefe
| 90929 ||  || — || September 28, 1997 || Kitt Peak || Spacewatch || FLO || align=right | 2.1 km || 
|-id=930 bgcolor=#fefefe
| 90930 ||  || — || September 30, 1997 || Kitt Peak || Spacewatch || NYS || align=right | 1.6 km || 
|-id=931 bgcolor=#fefefe
| 90931 ||  || — || September 30, 1997 || Xinglong || SCAP || — || align=right | 2.1 km || 
|-id=932 bgcolor=#fefefe
| 90932 ||  || — || October 3, 1997 || Caussols || ODAS || — || align=right | 1.7 km || 
|-id=933 bgcolor=#fefefe
| 90933 ||  || — || October 5, 1997 || Kleť || Kleť Obs. || NYS || align=right | 3.8 km || 
|-id=934 bgcolor=#fefefe
| 90934 ||  || — || October 6, 1997 || Ondřejov || P. Pravec || — || align=right | 2.0 km || 
|-id=935 bgcolor=#fefefe
| 90935 ||  || — || October 6, 1997 || Kitami || K. Endate, K. Watanabe || NYS || align=right | 1.4 km || 
|-id=936 bgcolor=#fefefe
| 90936 Neronet ||  ||  || October 11, 1997 || Ondřejov || L. Kotková || — || align=right | 3.6 km || 
|-id=937 bgcolor=#fefefe
| 90937 Josefdufek ||  ||  || October 11, 1997 || Ondřejov || L. Kotková || EUT || align=right | 1.4 km || 
|-id=938 bgcolor=#fefefe
| 90938 ||  || — || October 5, 1997 || Kitt Peak || Spacewatch || — || align=right | 1.4 km || 
|-id=939 bgcolor=#fefefe
| 90939 ||  || — || October 6, 1997 || Kitt Peak || Spacewatch || — || align=right | 2.0 km || 
|-id=940 bgcolor=#fefefe
| 90940 ||  || — || October 9, 1997 || Kitt Peak || Spacewatch || V || align=right | 1.0 km || 
|-id=941 bgcolor=#fefefe
| 90941 ||  || — || October 11, 1997 || Kitt Peak || Spacewatch || — || align=right | 1.7 km || 
|-id=942 bgcolor=#fefefe
| 90942 ||  || — || October 9, 1997 || Xinglong || SCAP || V || align=right | 1.4 km || 
|-id=943 bgcolor=#FA8072
| 90943 ||  || — || October 24, 1997 || Prescott || P. G. Comba || — || align=right | 3.0 km || 
|-id=944 bgcolor=#fefefe
| 90944 Pujol ||  ||  || October 25, 1997 || Castres || A. Klotz || — || align=right | 1.7 km || 
|-id=945 bgcolor=#fefefe
| 90945 ||  || — || October 22, 1997 || Xinglong || SCAP || — || align=right | 1.7 km || 
|-id=946 bgcolor=#fefefe
| 90946 ||  || — || October 25, 1997 || Kitt Peak || Spacewatch || NYS || align=right data-sort-value="0.90" | 900 m || 
|-id=947 bgcolor=#fefefe
| 90947 ||  || — || October 30, 1997 || Anderson Mesa || B. A. Skiff || — || align=right | 1.9 km || 
|-id=948 bgcolor=#fefefe
| 90948 ||  || — || November 6, 1997 || Oizumi || T. Kobayashi || NYS || align=right | 1.6 km || 
|-id=949 bgcolor=#fefefe
| 90949 ||  || — || November 6, 1997 || Nachi-Katsuura || Y. Shimizu, T. Urata || — || align=right | 2.0 km || 
|-id=950 bgcolor=#fefefe
| 90950 ||  || — || November 8, 1997 || Oizumi || T. Kobayashi || — || align=right | 2.5 km || 
|-id=951 bgcolor=#fefefe
| 90951 ||  || — || November 6, 1997 || Chichibu || N. Satō || — || align=right | 1.4 km || 
|-id=952 bgcolor=#fefefe
| 90952 ||  || — || November 1, 1997 || Xinglong || SCAP || — || align=right | 1.7 km || 
|-id=953 bgcolor=#fefefe
| 90953 Hideosaitou ||  ||  || November 7, 1997 || Nanyo || T. Okuni || ERI || align=right | 4.5 km || 
|-id=954 bgcolor=#fefefe
| 90954 ||  || — || November 19, 1997 || Oizumi || T. Kobayashi || NYS || align=right | 2.4 km || 
|-id=955 bgcolor=#fefefe
| 90955 ||  || — || November 19, 1997 || Chichibu || N. Satō || NYS || align=right | 1.6 km || 
|-id=956 bgcolor=#fefefe
| 90956 ||  || — || November 23, 1997 || Oizumi || T. Kobayashi || — || align=right | 1.7 km || 
|-id=957 bgcolor=#fefefe
| 90957 ||  || — || November 20, 1997 || Kitt Peak || Spacewatch || V || align=right | 1.5 km || 
|-id=958 bgcolor=#fefefe
| 90958 ||  || — || November 23, 1997 || Kitt Peak || Spacewatch || V || align=right | 1.3 km || 
|-id=959 bgcolor=#fefefe
| 90959 ||  || — || November 23, 1997 || Kitt Peak || Spacewatch || FLO || align=right | 4.4 km || 
|-id=960 bgcolor=#fefefe
| 90960 ||  || — || November 28, 1997 || Haleakala || NEAT || — || align=right | 2.2 km || 
|-id=961 bgcolor=#fefefe
| 90961 ||  || — || November 23, 1997 || Kitt Peak || Spacewatch || V || align=right | 1.3 km || 
|-id=962 bgcolor=#fefefe
| 90962 ||  || — || November 24, 1997 || Kitt Peak || Spacewatch || V || align=right | 1.4 km || 
|-id=963 bgcolor=#fefefe
| 90963 ||  || — || November 29, 1997 || Kitt Peak || Spacewatch || — || align=right | 1.6 km || 
|-id=964 bgcolor=#fefefe
| 90964 ||  || — || November 28, 1997 || Xinglong || SCAP || NYS || align=right | 2.0 km || 
|-id=965 bgcolor=#fefefe
| 90965 ||  || — || November 25, 1997 || Kitt Peak || Spacewatch || V || align=right | 1.7 km || 
|-id=966 bgcolor=#fefefe
| 90966 ||  || — || November 28, 1997 || Kitt Peak || Spacewatch || — || align=right | 1.8 km || 
|-id=967 bgcolor=#fefefe
| 90967 ||  || — || November 29, 1997 || Kitt Peak || Spacewatch || MAS || align=right | 1.1 km || 
|-id=968 bgcolor=#fefefe
| 90968 ||  || — || November 29, 1997 || Kitt Peak || Spacewatch || — || align=right | 1.4 km || 
|-id=969 bgcolor=#fefefe
| 90969 ||  || — || November 29, 1997 || Socorro || LINEAR || — || align=right | 2.0 km || 
|-id=970 bgcolor=#fefefe
| 90970 ||  || — || November 29, 1997 || Socorro || LINEAR || NYS || align=right | 1.5 km || 
|-id=971 bgcolor=#fefefe
| 90971 ||  || — || November 29, 1997 || Socorro || LINEAR || V || align=right | 1.6 km || 
|-id=972 bgcolor=#fefefe
| 90972 ||  || — || November 29, 1997 || Socorro || LINEAR || NYS || align=right | 1.5 km || 
|-id=973 bgcolor=#fefefe
| 90973 ||  || — || November 29, 1997 || Socorro || LINEAR || — || align=right | 1.9 km || 
|-id=974 bgcolor=#fefefe
| 90974 ||  || — || November 29, 1997 || Socorro || LINEAR || — || align=right | 4.0 km || 
|-id=975 bgcolor=#fefefe
| 90975 ||  || — || November 29, 1997 || Socorro || LINEAR || NYS || align=right | 1.3 km || 
|-id=976 bgcolor=#fefefe
| 90976 ||  || — || November 29, 1997 || Socorro || LINEAR || FLO || align=right | 1.5 km || 
|-id=977 bgcolor=#fefefe
| 90977 ||  || — || November 29, 1997 || Socorro || LINEAR || NYS || align=right | 1.7 km || 
|-id=978 bgcolor=#fefefe
| 90978 ||  || — || November 26, 1997 || Socorro || LINEAR || — || align=right | 2.7 km || 
|-id=979 bgcolor=#fefefe
| 90979 ||  || — || November 26, 1997 || Socorro || LINEAR || V || align=right | 1.5 km || 
|-id=980 bgcolor=#fefefe
| 90980 ||  || — || November 29, 1997 || Socorro || LINEAR || V || align=right | 1.4 km || 
|-id=981 bgcolor=#fefefe
| 90981 ||  || — || November 29, 1997 || Socorro || LINEAR || MAS || align=right | 1.2 km || 
|-id=982 bgcolor=#fefefe
| 90982 ||  || — || December 3, 1997 || Chichibu || N. Satō || — || align=right | 2.0 km || 
|-id=983 bgcolor=#fefefe
| 90983 ||  || — || December 6, 1997 || Bédoin || P. Antonini || — || align=right | 1.6 km || 
|-id=984 bgcolor=#fefefe
| 90984 ||  || — || December 5, 1997 || Caussols || ODAS || — || align=right | 1.5 km || 
|-id=985 bgcolor=#fefefe
| 90985 ||  || — || December 5, 1997 || Caussols || ODAS || V || align=right | 1.4 km || 
|-id=986 bgcolor=#fefefe
| 90986 ||  || — || December 8, 1997 || Xinglong || SCAP || — || align=right | 1.6 km || 
|-id=987 bgcolor=#fefefe
| 90987 ||  || — || December 15, 1997 || Xinglong || SCAP || FLO || align=right | 1.6 km || 
|-id=988 bgcolor=#fefefe
| 90988 ||  || — || December 4, 1997 || La Silla || UDTS || NYS || align=right | 1.4 km || 
|-id=989 bgcolor=#fefefe
| 90989 || 1997 YP || — || December 20, 1997 || Oizumi || T. Kobayashi || — || align=right | 1.9 km || 
|-id=990 bgcolor=#fefefe
| 90990 ||  || — || December 22, 1997 || Xinglong || SCAP || — || align=right | 2.0 km || 
|-id=991 bgcolor=#fefefe
| 90991 ||  || — || December 24, 1997 || Xinglong || SCAP || KLI || align=right | 4.0 km || 
|-id=992 bgcolor=#fefefe
| 90992 ||  || — || December 24, 1997 || Xinglong || SCAP || NYS || align=right | 1.5 km || 
|-id=993 bgcolor=#fefefe
| 90993 ||  || — || December 28, 1997 || Kitt Peak || Spacewatch || NYS || align=right | 1.3 km || 
|-id=994 bgcolor=#fefefe
| 90994 ||  || — || December 29, 1997 || Xinglong || SCAP || MAS || align=right | 2.2 km || 
|-id=995 bgcolor=#fefefe
| 90995 || 1998 AK || — || January 2, 1998 || Nachi-Katsuura || Y. Shimizu, T. Urata || NYS || align=right | 2.4 km || 
|-id=996 bgcolor=#fefefe
| 90996 ||  || — || January 8, 1998 || Modra || A. Galád, A. Pravda || — || align=right | 1.7 km || 
|-id=997 bgcolor=#fefefe
| 90997 || 1998 BC || — || January 16, 1998 || Oizumi || T. Kobayashi || — || align=right | 3.8 km || 
|-id=998 bgcolor=#E9E9E9
| 90998 || 1998 BU || — || January 19, 1998 || Oizumi || T. Kobayashi || — || align=right | 2.6 km || 
|-id=999 bgcolor=#fefefe
| 90999 ||  || — || January 22, 1998 || Kitt Peak || Spacewatch || — || align=right | 2.7 km || 
|-id=000 bgcolor=#fefefe
| 91000 ||  || — || January 24, 1998 || Haleakala || NEAT || NYS || align=right | 4.7 km || 
|}

References

External links 
 Discovery Circumstances: Numbered Minor Planets (90001)–(95000) (IAU Minor Planet Center)

0090